= Sitt al-Sham =

Personal life
- Died: January 1220 Damascus, Ayyubid dynasty
- Spouse: Umar ibn Lājīn; Muhammad ibn Shirkuh
- Parent: Najm ad-Din Ayyub (father)
- Other name: Umm Husam al-Din
- Occupation: Islamic scholar, Humanitarian Services

Religious life
- Religion: Islam
- Denomination: Sunni
- Jurisprudence: Shafi'i

Fatimah Khatun bint Najm ad-Dīn Abu al-Shukr Ayyub ibn Shādhi ibn Marwān (died 1220), popularly known as Sitt al-Sham, was a second sister of Saladin, probably older than Rabi'a Khatun. She is known for founding Al-Shamiyah al-Kubra Madrasa.

== Biography ==
Born in Damascus to Kurdish Ayyubid family. She was the wife of Muhammad ibn Shirkuh of Homs. Some historians are confused regarding her name; they think it to be Zumurrud. His father was called al-Malik al-Afdal as he was a minister with his brother Asad ad-Din Shirkuh in the court of Nur ad-Din Zengi.

She married Umar ibn Lājīn and gave birth to their first child, Husām al-Dīn ibn Lājīn. Her first husband Umar ibn Lajin died shortly thereafter. Then she married his paternal cousin, Muhammad ibn Shirkuh, who was the ruler of Homs.
