= Muhammad ibn Shirkuh =

Ayyubid emir of Homs from 1179 to 1186

- Emir of Homs
- Reign: 1179–1186
- Predecessor: None
- Successor: Al-Mujahid
- Born: Unknown
- Died: 4 March 1186
- Spouse: Sitt al-Sham (Saladin's sister)
- Dynasty: Ayyubid
- Religion: Sunni Islam

Nasr ad-Din Abu Abdallah Muhammad ibn Asad ad-Din Shirkuh (sometimes referred to as Nasr ad-Din ibn Shirkuh and al-Malik al-Qahir) was the Kurdish Ayyubid emir of Homs from 1179 to 1186.

== Accession ==
The Zangid Sultan Nur ad-Din Zengi had given the domain of Homs to Shirkuh in 1164. Five years later, on Shirkuh’s death, Nur ad-Din took the city back, but following his victory at the Horns of Hama in 1175, Saladin gave the domain of Homs to his son Muhammad ibn Shirkuh. He also gave him Palmyra and ar-Rahba. Saladin thought so highly of Muhammad ibn Shirkuh that in 1185 (581) he planned to give him the major strategic domain of Mosul in northern Iraq. However, the campaign to take the city from the Zengids was not successful, and he had to withdraw his forces, so Muhammad ibn Shirkuh received nothing.

== Family ==
Muhammad ibn Shirkuh married a sister of Saladin, who was thus his own first cousin, known as Sitt Ash-Sham (‘The Lady of Syria’, i.e. not her given name). Her full name was Sitt Ash-Sham Zumurrud Khatun bint Najm d-Din Ayyub. When she married Muhammad ibn Shirkuh she was the widow of one of Saladin’s military commanders named Lajin, by whom he had a son named Husan ad-Din Umar b. Lajin. Sitt Ash-Sham was famous for the scale and generosity of her charitable works. It is not clear whether she was or was not the mother of his heir Al-Mujahid, but it is generally assumed that she was not.

== Death ==
Saladin fell ill while laying siege to Mosul in 1185 and was obliged to retreat back into Syria. As he began making arrangements for his succession, Muhammad ibn Shirkuh saw an opportunity to expand his domains. He hurried away to Homs and made arrangements with certain notables in Damascus for them to surrender their city to him in the event of Saladin’s death.

Before any of his plans could be put into effect, however, Muhammad ibn Shirkuh died suddenly in Homs on 4 March 1186 (10 Dhu’l Hijja 581). The cause of his death was apparently excessive drinking. He was succeeded in Homs by his thirteen-year-old son Al Malik Al-Mujahid Asad ad-Din Shirkuh II. Widowed a second time, his wife Sitt ash-Sham outlived him by more than thirty years and died in 1220 (616) in Damascus.
