= Statue of Saladin =

Monument in Damascus, Syria

- تمثال صلاح الدين الأيوبي (Arabic)
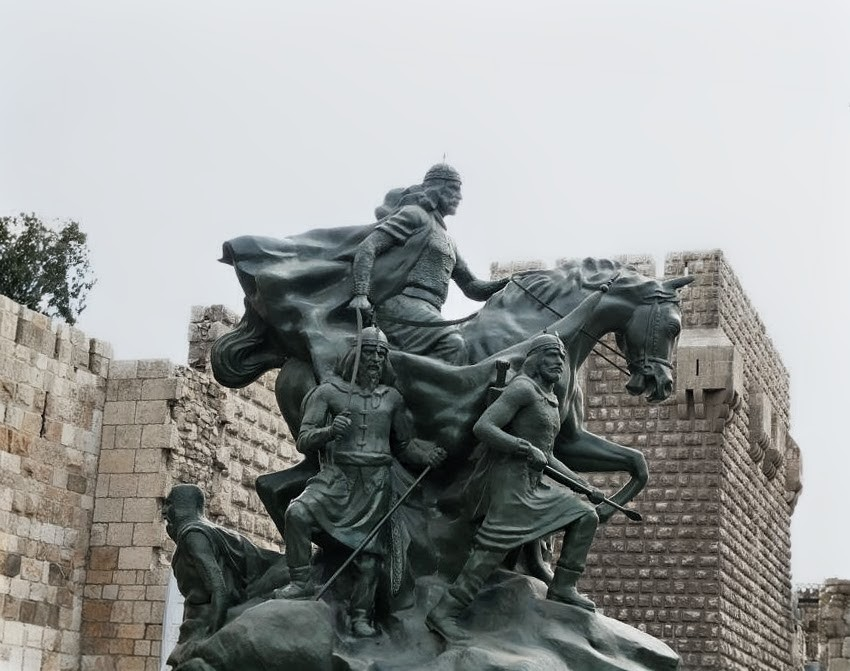
- Statue of Saladin in front of the Citadel of Damascus
- Artist: Abdallah al-Sayed
- Year: 1993 (inaugurated)
- Type: Oversize equestrian statue
- Medium: bronze
- Location: In front of the Citadel of Damascus, Damascus, Syria; 33°30′42.3″N 36°18′2.1″E
- Owner: Municipality of Damascus

The Statue of Saladin (Arabic: تمثال صلاح الدين الأيوبي) is an oversize equestrian bronze statue depicting the Ayyubid Sultan Saladin located in front of the 11th century Citadel of Damascus, in the Ancient City of Damascus in Damascus, Syria. The statue was designed by Syrian sculptor Abdallah al-Sayed. It was unveiled by the then Syrian president Hafez al-Assad in 1993, marking the 800th anniversary of Saladin's death.

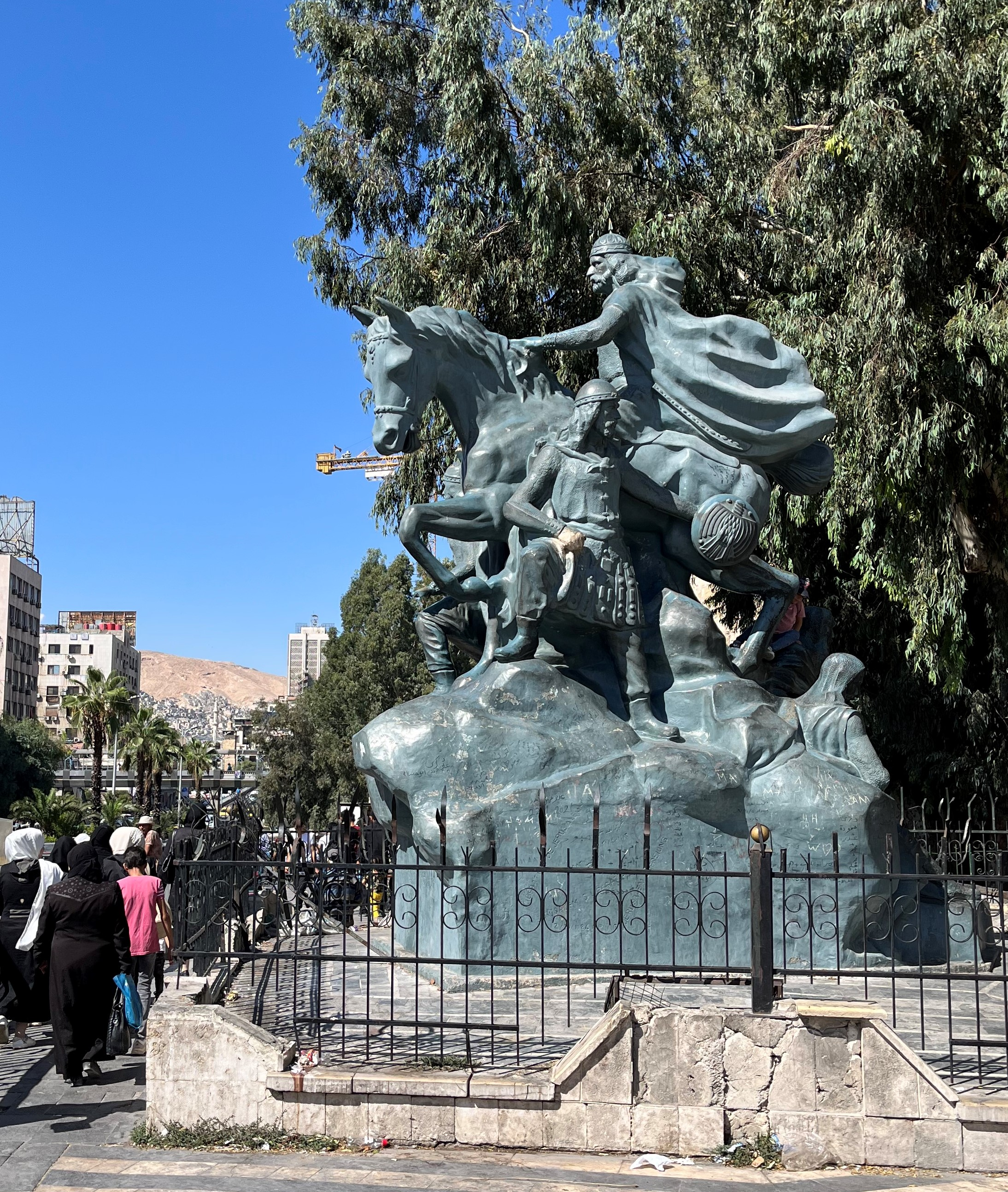
Statue of Saladin in Damascus (2022)

The bronze statue represents Saladin's victory at the Battle of Hattin, with him seated proudly and triumphantly on his horse accompanied by two swordsmen with Renaud de Chatillon and Guy de Lusignan whom he captured at the battle walking behind him on foot while the crown of the Kingdom of Jerusalem lies on the floor.

== Other statues of Saladin ==
=== Old Jerusalem ===
- Saladin and Richard the Lionheart equestrian statue, Old Jerusalem

=== Karak ===
- Saladin equestrian statue, Karak, Jordan
