= Battle of the Horns of Hama =

Ayyubid victory over the Zengids

- Part of the Ayyubid-Zengid war
Date	13 April 1175
Location	Hama
Result	Ayyubid victory
Territorial changes	Ayyubids take control all of Syria apart from Aleppo

Belligerents
Ayyubid Sultanate	Zengid remnants

Commanders and leaders
Saladin; Muhammad ibn Shirkuh; Shihab al-Din al-Harimi	Muzaffar ad-Din Gökböri

Strength
10,000	10,000

Casualties and losses
Minimal	Minimal

The Battle of the Horns of Hama or Hammah (Arabic: معركة قرون حماة, Qurun Hama;(Kurdish: شەڕی قۆچەکانی حەمە, şerê qijikên hamayê) 13 April AD 1175; 19 Ramadan ah 570) was an Ayyubid victory over the Zengids, which left Saladin in control of Damascus, Baalbek, and Homs. Gökböri commanded the right wing of the Zengid army, which broke Saladin's left flank before being routed by a charge from Saladin's personal guard. Despite around 20,000 men being involved on both sides, Saladin gained a nearly-bloodless victory by the psychological effect of the arrival of his Egyptian reinforcements.

Following the battle, Saladin initially placed the rightful heirs over these territories: Muhammad ibn Shirkuh in Homs, Palmyra, and al-Rahba; Shihab al-Din al-Harimi over Hama and Ibn al-Muqaddam in Baalbek. Gökböri himself defected to Saladin in 1182. Once his power was further consolidated, however, they were deposed in favour of members of his own dynasty.

On 6 May 1175, Saladin's opponents agreed to a treaty recognizing his rule over Syria apart from Aleppo. Saladin requested that the Abbasid caliph acknowledge his right to the entirety of Nur ad-Din's empire, but he was recognized simply as lord over what he already held and was encouraged to attack the Crusader kingdom in Jerusalem.
