= List of Ayyubid rulers =

Sultans of the Ayyubid Sultanate
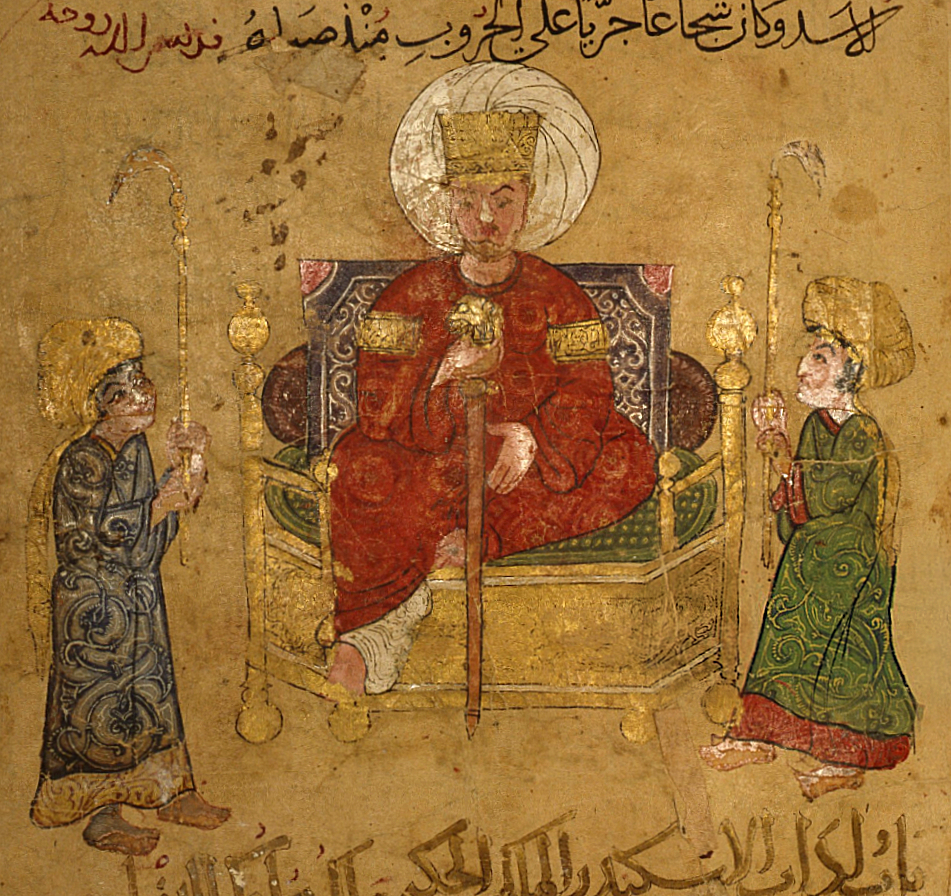
- Ayyubid Sultan on his throne, early 13th century

Details
- Last monarch: al-Ashraf Musa (Egypt); an-Nasir Yusuf (Syria); al-Adil Sulayman II (Hasankeyf)
- Formed: 1171
- Abolished: 1260; 1524 (rump-state)
- Residences: Cairo (1171-1250); Damascus (1174-1260); Hasankeyf (1232-1524)

The Ayyubid dynasty ruled Egypt and other parts of the Middle East from 12th to 14th centuries. The following is a list of Ayyubid rulers by region.

== Sultans of Egypt (1171-1254) ==
See Rulers of Islamic Egypt.

No.	Portrait/Coin	Name	Reign	Life details
1		Saladin الملك الناصر صلاح الدين يوسف بن أيوب al-Malik an-Nāṣir Ṣalāḥ ad-Dīn Yūsuf ibn Ayyūb	May 1174 – 4 March 1193 (~19 years)	1137 – 4 March 1193 (aged 56): Vizier of Fatimid caliph al-Adid; abolished Fatimid caliphate; Zengid Governor of Egypt (1171).; Recovered Jerusalem from Crusaders.
2		al-Aziz Uthman الملك العزيز عماد الدين عثمان بن يوسف al-Malik al-ʿAzīz ʿImād ad-Dīn ʿUthmān ibn Yūsuf	4 March 1193 – 29 November 1198 (~5 years)	c. 14 January 1172 – 29 November 1198 (aged 26): Saladin's son.; Died in a hunting accident.
3		al-Mansur Muhammad الملك المنصور ناصر الدين محمد بن عثمان al-Malik al-Manṣūr Nāṣir ad-Dīn Muḥammad ibn ʿUthmān	29 November 1198 – February 1200 (~1 year)	1189 – after 1216 (aged 27): al-Aziz's son; ascended as a child.; Deposed by his great-uncle al-Adil; exiled to Aleppo.
4		al-Adil I الملك العادل سيف الدين أبو بكر بن أيوب al-Malik al-ʿĀdil Sayf ad-Dīn Abū Bakr ibn Ayyūb	February 1200 – 31 August 1218 (~18 years)	June 1145 – 31 August 1218 (aged 73): Brother of Saladin; overthrew his grand-nephew al-Mansur.; Died preparing against the Fifth Crusade.
5		al-Kamil الملك الكامل ناصر الدين محمد بن أبي بكر al-Malik al-Kāmil Nāṣir ad-Dīn Muḥammad ibn Abī Bakr	2 September 1218 – 8 March 1238 (~19 years)	c. 1180 – 8 March 1238 (aged 57): Son of al-Adil I.; Treaty of Jaffa (1229); Jerusalem recovered from Crusaders.
6		al-Adil II الملك العادل سيف الدين أبو بكر بن محمد al-Malik al-ʿĀdil Sayf ad-Dīn Abū Bakr ibn Muḥammad	8 March 1238 – 31 May 1240 (~2 years)	c. 1221 – 9 February 1248 (aged 27): Son of al-Kamil.; Deposed and imprisoned by his half-brother as-Salih Ayyub; died in prison.
7		as-Salih Ayyub الملك الصالح نجم الدين أيوب بن محمد al-Malik aṣ-Ṣāliḥ Najm ad-Dīn Ayyūb ibn Muḥammad	1 June 1240 – 21 November 1249 (~9 years)	5 November 1205 – 22 November 1249 (aged 44): Half-brother of al-Adil II.; Died of illness during the Seventh Crusade.
8		al-Muazzam Turanshah الملك المعظم غياث الدين تورانشاه بن أيوب al-Malik al-Muʿaẓẓam Ghiyāth ad-Dīn Tūrānshāh ibn Ayyūb	22 November 1249 – 2 May 1250 (~5 months)	d. 2 May 1250: Son of al-Salih; assassinated by Bahri Mamluks.
Interregnum by Shajar al-Durr and al-Mu'izz Aybak (2 May 1250 – 4 August 1250)
9		al-Ashraf Musa الملك الأشرف مظفر الدين موسى بن يوسف al-Malik al-Ashraf Muẓaffar ad-Dīn Mūsā ibn Yūsuf	August 1250 – 1254 (~4 years)	b. 1245: Son of either an-Nasir Yusuf or al-Ma'sud Yusuf.; Installed as a child nominal ruler by Aybak; eventually deposed by him.

== Emirs of Damascus (1174-1260) ==
See Rulers of Damascus.

1. Saladin, 1174–1193
2. al-Afdal Ali, son of Saladin, 1193–1196
3. al-Adil I, brother of Saladin, 1196–1218
4. al-Mu'azzam Isa, son of al-Adil I, 1218–1227
5. an-Nasir Dawud, son of al-Mu'azzam Isa, 1227–1229
6. al-Ashraf Musa, son of al-Adil I, 1229–1237
7. as-Salih Ismail, son of al-Adil I, 1237–1238, 1239–1245
8. al-Kamil, son of al-Adil I, 1238
9. al-Adil II, son of al-Kamil, 1238–1239
10. as-Salih Ayyub, son of al-Kamil, 1239, 1245–1249
11. al-Muazzam Turanshah, son of as-Salih Ayyub, 1249–1250
12. an-Nasir Yusuf, son of al-Aziz Muhammad, 1250–1260

Takeover by Mongols, and then Mamluks following the Battle of Ain Jalut.

== Emirs of Aleppo (1185-1260) ==
See Rulers of Aleppo.

1. Saladin, 1183–1193
2. al-Zahir Ghazi, son of Saladin, 1193-1216
3. al-Aziz Muhammad, son of al-Zahir Ghazi, 1216-1236
4. an-Nasir Yusuf, son of al-Aziz Muhammad, 1236–1260

Takeover by Mongols, and then Mamluks following the Battle of Ain Jalut.

== Emirs of al-Jazirah (1185-1260) ==
See Upper Mesopotamia & Al-Jazirah.

1. Saladin, 1186–1193
2. al-Adil I, brother of Saladin, 1193–1200
3. al-Awhad Ayyub, son of al-Adil I, 1200–1210
4. al-Ashraf Musa, son of al-Adil I, 1210–1220
5. al-Muzaffar Ghazi, son of al-Adil I, 1220–1244
6. al-Kamil Muhammad, son of al-Muzaffar Ghazi, 1244–1260

Takeover by Mongols in 1260.

== Emirs of al-Karak (1188-1263) ==
Also referred to as governors of Transjordan. See al-Karak, Crusader, Ayyubid and Mamluk Periods.

1. al-Adil I, brother of Saladin, 1188–1193
2. al-Mu'azzam Isa, son of al-Adil I, 1193–1227
3. an-Nasir Dawud, son of al-Mu'azzam Isa, 1229–1249
4. al-Mughith Umar, son of al-Adil II, 1249–1263

Takeover by Mamluks under Baybars in 1263.

== Emirs of Yemen (1173-1229) ==
See Yemen, Ayyubid Conquest.

1. al-Mu'azzam Turan Shah, brother of Saladin, 1173–1181
2. al-Aziz Tughtakin, brother of Saladin, 1181–1197
3. al-Mu'izz Isma'il, son of al-Aziz Tughtakin, 1197–1202
4. an-Nasir Muhammad, son of al-Aziz Tughtakin, 1202–1214
5. al-Muzaffar Sulayman, grandson of al-Muzaffar I Umar, 1214–1215
6. al-Mas'ud Yusuf, son of al-Kamil, 1215–1229

Takeover by Rasulid dynasty in 1229.

== Emirs of Homs (1178-1263) ==
See Homs, Seljuk, Ayyubid and Mamluk Rule.

1. al-Qahir Muhammad, cousin of Saladin, 1178–1186
2. al-Mujahid Shirkuh, son of al-Qahir Muhammad, 1186–1240
3. al-Mansur Ibrahim, son of al-Mujahid Shirkuh, 1240–1246
4. al-Ashraf Musa, son of al-Mansur Ibrahim, 1246–1248
5. an-Nasir Yusuf, Emir of Aleppo, son of al-Aziz Muhammad, 1250–1260
6. al-Ashraf Musa (second rule), 1260–1263 (vassal to the Mongols and then Mamluks)

Takeover by Mamluks under Baybars from 1263.

== Emirs of Hama (1178-1341) ==
See Hama, Muslim Rule.

1. al-Muzaffar I Umar, son of Nur ad-Din Shahanshah (brother of Saladin), 1178–1191
2. al-Mansur I Muhammad, son of al-Muzaffar Umar, 1191–1221
3. al-Nasir Kilij Arslan, son of al-Mansur Muhammad, 1221–1229
4. al-Muzaffar II Mahmud, son of al-Mansur Muhammad, 1229–1244
5. al-Mansur II Muhammad, son of al-Muzaffar II Mahmud, 1244–1260, 1260–1284 (as Mamluk vassal)
6. al-Muzaffar III Mahmud, son of al-Mansur II Muhammad, 1284–1299 (as Mamluk vassal) (Note: Hama was directly ruled by emirs of mamluk sultan al-Nasir Muhammad from 1299 to 1310.)
7. al-Mu'ayyad Isma'il, brother of al-Mansur II Muhammad, 1310–1332 (as Mamluk vassal)
8. al-Afdal Muhammad, son of al-Mu'ayyad Isma'il, 1332–1341 (as Mamluk vassal)

Formal takeover by Mamluk Sultanate in 1341.

== Emirs of Baalbek (1175-1260) ==
See Baalbek, Middle Ages.

1. al-Mu'azzam Turan Shah, brother of Saladin, 1178–1179
2. al-Mansur Farrukh Shah, nephew of al-Mu'azzam Turan Shah, 1179–1182
3. al-Amjad Bahram Shah, son of Farrukh Shah, 1182–1230

Incorporated into the emirate of Damascus in 1230 under al-Ashraf Musa. Ruled thereafter by rulers of Damascus till its takeover by Mongols, and then Mamluks following the Battle of Ain Jalut in 1260.

== Emirs of Banyas (1218-1260) ==
See Banyas.

1. al-Aziz Uthman, son of al-Adil I, 1218–1232
2. al-Zahir Ghazi, son of al-'Aziz Uthman, 1232–1232
3. al-Sa'id Hasan, son of al-'Aziz Uthman, 1232–1247

Incorporated into the emirate of Damascus in 1247 under as-Salih Ayyub. Ruled thereafter by rulers of Damascus till its takeover by Mongols, and then Mamluks following the Battle of Ain Jalut in 1260.

== Emirs of Hisn Kayfa (1232-1524) ==
See Hisn Kaifa, Ayyubid and Mongols.

1. as-Salih Ayyub, son of al-Kamil, 1232–1239
2. al-Mu'azzam Turanshah, son of as-Salih Ayyub, 1239–1249
3. al-Muwahhid Taqiyya ad-Din Abdullah, son of al-Mu'azzam Turanshah, 1249–1294
4. al-Kamil Ahmad I, 1294–1325
5. al-Adil Mujir ad-Din Muhammad, 1325–1328
6. al-Adil Shahab ad-Din, 1328–1349 (Meinecke gives this ruler as al-Adil Ghazi, 1341–1367)
7. as-Salih Abu-Bakr Khalil I, 1349–1378
8. al-Adil Fakhr ad-Din Sulayman I, 1378-1432 (Meinecke gives this ruler as al-Adil Sulayman, 1377–1424)
9. al-Ashraf Sharaf ad Din, 1432–1433
10. as-Salih Salah ad-Din, 1433–1452
11. al-Kamil Ahmad II, 1452–1455
12. al-Adil Khalif, 1455–1462
13. as-Salih Khalil II, 1482–1511, 1514–1520
14. al-Adil Sulayman II, 1511–1514, 1521–1524
15. al-Malik Hussayn, 1520–1521

Takeover by the Ottoman Empire in 1524.

== Genealogy ==
Family tree of Ayyubid rulers. Sultans of Egypt (Nominal Ayyubid overlords) in bold.

E: Egypt, D: Damascus, A: Aleppo, K: Karak, Y: Yemen, H: Hama, Ho: Homs, B: Baalbek, By: Banyas

Shadi ibn Marwan
Ayyub	Shirkuh
**Saladin**; E. D. 1174-1193; A. 1183-1193; J. 1186-1193	**al-Adil I** K. 1188-1193; J. 1193-1200; D. 1196-1218; E. 1200-1218	Shahanshah	al-Muazzam Turanshah; Y. 1173-1181; B. 1178-1179	al-Aziz Tughtakin; Y. 1181-1197	al-Qahir Muhammad; Ho. 1178-1186
**al-Aziz Uthman**; E. 1193-1198	al-Zahir Ghazi; A. 1193-1216	al-Afdal Ali; D. 1193-1196	**al-Kamil**; E. 1218-1238; D. 1238	al-Awhad Ayyub; J. 1200-1210	al-Muazzam Isa; K. 1193-1227; D. 1218-1227	al-Ashraf Musa; J. 1210-1220; D. 1229-1237	as-Salih Isma'il; D. 1237-1238, 1239-1245	al-Mansur Farrukhshah; B. 1179-1182	al-Muzaffar Umar; H. 1178-1191	al-Mu'izz Isma'il; Y. 1197-1202	al-Nasir Ayyub; Y. 1202-1214	al-Mujahid Shirkuh; Ho. 1186-1240
**al-Mansur Muhammad**; E. 1198-1200	al-Aziz Muhammad; A. 1216-1236	**al-Adil II**; E. 1238-1240; D. 1238-1239	**as-Salih Ayyub**; D. 1239, 1245-1249; E. 1240-1249	al-Mas'ud Yusuf; Y. 1215-1229	al-Nasir Dawud; D. 1227-1229; K. 1229-1249	al-Muzaffar Ghazi; J. 1220-1244	al-Aziz Uthman; By. 1218-1232	Bahram Shah; B. 1182-1230	al-Mansur I Muhammad; H. 1191-1221	Shahanshah	al-Mansur Ibrahim; Ho. 1240-1246
al-Nasir Yusuf; A. 1236-1260; D. 1250-1260; Ho. 1248-1260	al-Mughith Umar; K. 1249-1263	**al-Mu'azzam Turanshah**; E. D. 1249-1250	al-Kamil Muhammad; J. 1244-1260	al-Zahir Ghazi; By. 1232	al-Nasir Kilij Arslan; H. 1221-1229	al-Muzaffar II Mahmud; H. 1229-1244	al-Muzaffar Sulayman; Y. 1214-1215	al-Ashraf Musa; Ho. 1246-1248
**al-Ashraf Musa**; E. 1250-1254	al-Sa'id Hassan; By. 1232-1247	al-Mansur II Muhammad; H. 1244-1284	al-Muzaffar Ali
al-Muzaffar III Mahmud; H. 1284-1299	al-Mu'ayyad Isma'il; H. 1310-1332
al-Afdal Muhammad; H. 1332-1341

== Sources ==
- Bosworth, C.E. (1996). The New Islamic Dynasties: A Chronological and Genealogical Manual. Columbia University Press, pp. 70-75.
- Humphreys, R.S. (1977). From Saladin to the Mongols: The Ayyubids of Damascus, 1193-1260. New York: SUNY press. pp. 381–386. ISBN 0-87395-263-4.
- Lane-Poole, Stanley (1894), "Ayyūbids", The Mohammadan Dynasties: Chronological and Genealogical Tables with Historical Introductions, Westminster: Archibald Constable and Company, pp. 74–79, OCLC 1199708
- Meinecke, Michael (1996), "3. Hasankeyf/Ḥiṣn Kaifā on the Tigris: A Regional Center on the Crossroad of Foreign Influences", Patterns of Stylistic Changes in Islamic Architecture: Local Traditions Versus Migrating Artists, New York University Press, ISBN 9780814754924
