= Kurdish–Turkish relations =

Historical relations between Kurds and Turks

Kurdish–Turkish relations covers the historical relations between Kurds and Turks.

== Seljuk Empire ==
Relations began when Alp Arslan was seeking to pass through Kurdistan in order to conquer Anatolia. Kurds were already significantly Muslim, and were a buffer between the Muslim Middle East and the Christian Anatolia and South Caucasus. While preparing for the Battle of Manzikert in 1071, Alp Arslan earned the trust of powerful Kurdish principalities and tribes, and Kurds played a vital role during the Battle of Manzikert, which was as important to Kurds as it was to Turks.

== Ayyubid Sultanate ==
The Ayyubid dynasty was founded by Shirkuh, a Kurdish retainer of the Zengid prince Nur al-Din. Shirkuh was succeeded by his nephew Saladin. Under Saladin, the Ayyubids fought and defeated the Zengids. They also took control of Damascus, Baalbek, and Homs. Gökböri was the commander of the right wing of the Zengid army, and he broke the Ayyubid left wing before being defeated by Saladin's personal guards. Gökböri switched to the Ayyubid army when it was obvious that the Zengids were going to be defeated.

Kurdish was the mother tongue of the Ayyubids at the time they left their homeland in Dvin, Armenia. Saladin, born in Tikrit, spoke both Arabic and Kurdish, and likely Turkish. After Shirkuh's death, Ziyauddin Isa al-Hakkari, a companion of Saladin from the Hakkari tribe, had visited the leaders of each faction during elections to endorse Saladin, and while advising another Kurd, Qutbuddin Khosrow ibn al-Talal, he stated "what is needed now, above all, is an understanding between you and Saladin, especially because of his Kurdish origin, so that the command does not go from him to the Turks." After Saladin was elected, Turkish emirs were expecting a possible conflict with the Kurds, although it never happened and the situation quickly deescalated.

Yasser Tabbaa, an Islamic anthropologist, claimed that by the late 12th century, the Ayyubid rulers had completely "Arabized". Some Iranic elements were detected in their names, such as Turan-Shah, Shahanshah, Bahramshah, Farrukh Shah.

Kurds dominated the Ayyubid cavalry. Turkomans and Arabs comprised most of the infantry. The Ayyubid rulers of Egypt utilised slave soldiers. By the first half of the 13th century, most of the Ayyubid slave soldiers were Kipchak Turks and Circassians. They continued to speak Kipchak Turkic.

The Ayyubids generally employed Kurds, Turks, and Caucasians in higher-ranking military, government, and bureaucratic fields. Tensions between Kurds and Turks would occasionally arise when the high positions were at risk. Towards the end of the Ayyubid period, the Turks began to outnumber the Kurds in the army.

== Mamluk Sultanate ==
The Khwarazmiyya were the army of the Khwarazmian Empire who were exiled after the Mongol invasion of the Khwarazmian Empire. In late March 1246, amid tensions between the Ayyubids and the Khwarazmiyya, the Khwarazmiyya revolted and besieged Damascus. Salih Ayyub made the biggest purchase of Turkish slave soldiers out of any Ayyubid ruler, and his army officially had a Turkish majority. By 1246, the Khwarazmiyya were defeated and many joined the Ayyubids. Another group of the Khwarazmiyya under Kushlu-Khan joined with the Mongols in Mesopotamia. There were Khwarazmiyya veterans in the Mongol army in the Battle of Ain Jalut in 1260, which was their last historical appearance.

The Ayyubid sultan Salih Ayyub and his mostly Kipchak Turkic slave soldiers, the Salihiyya, began to have problems in 1249, when Louis IX of France captured Damietta as part of the Seventh Crusade. Salih Ayyub died shortly after and was succeeded by his son, Mu'azzam Turanshah. Although the Turks had initially welcomed his succession, Mu'azzam Turanshah challenged the Turkic dominance in the Ayyubid army by promoting his Kurdish companions from Jazira and the Levant to higher positions.

On 11 February 1250, the Bahriyya, led by Baybars, defeated the Crusaders at the Battle of al-Mansura. The Crusaders were further destroyed after the Battle of Fariskur on 6 April. King Louis IX was captured, ending the Seventh Crusade. Mu'azzam Turanshah constantly promoted the Mu'azzamiyya, at the expense of the Salihiyya. On 2 May 1250, the Salihiyya assassinated Mu'azzam Turanshah in Fariskur. An electoral college dominated by the Salihiyya settled on Salih Ayyub's widow, Shajar al-Durr, which marked the end of the Ayyubid Sultanate and the beginning the Mamluk Sultanate.

== Ottoman Empire ==
The Safavids had control of Eastern Anatolia, until the Battle of Chaldiran, in which the Kurds allied with the Ottomans. The Kurdish forces also played a big role in taking Diyarbakır. The Ottomans referred to Kurds as the "Black Nation", and to Oghuz Turks as the "Grey Nation". After the Ottomans annexed Eastern Anatolia, Selim I rewarded the Kurds with tax and military exemptions when needed, as well as semi-autonomous status, which was protected and recognized by the Ottomans. The autonomy, under control of various Kurdish emirates, lasted from 1514 until the mid-1800s. During the Ottoman–Hotaki war, some Kurds supported the Hotaks, and when the Hotaks captured Iran, they had good relations with the Kurds, while most other Iranian people saw them as usurpers, and eventually revolted in Isfahan. In 1830, Mahmud II began to implement reforms which included Turkish nationalism, and even partially inspired the ideology of the Turkish National Movement. The reforms included the centralisation of the Ottoman Empire, which removed the autonomous status of the Kurds. There were subsequent Kurdish revolts against the Ottomans, however they were not nationalist and were only against certain state policies. The vast majority of Kurds remained loyal to the Ottoman Empire largely until the Young Turk Revolution, where the Young Turks began enforcing Turkish nationalism, which sparked some Kurdish nationalist revolts, however the revolts were unsuccessful as they were small, poorly coordinated, and did not enjoy much support from Kurds. Abdul Hamid II was a Pan-Islamist who rejected Ottomanism, and was among the most pro-Kurdish of the Ottoman sultans. Kurds formed the majority of the Hamidiye cavalry. Turks in Anatolia were introduced to nationalism much earlier, while Kurds in Kurdistan were either unaware of it, unable to understand it, or refused to accept it. Some Kurds living in Anatolian cities like Istanbul were inspired by the Turks to form a Kurdish nationalism, although it did not gain any support in Kurdistan. Kurds fought for the Ottoman Empire during World War I. However, towards the end of the Ottoman Empire, many Kurds began to resent Turks, such as Sheikh Said, who referred to Turks as "oppressive" and "barbaric", and began advocating for separatism, criticizing the Ottoman government for its policies on Kurds, and claiming that "never in its history has Kurdistan been in such a state of devastation." Nuri Dersimi claimed that when he lived in Istanbul, Kurds began to hold anti-Turkish views after increased state propagation of Turkish nationalism after the Balkan Wars, stating that "even those Kurds who had no interest in the Kurdish cause were agitated and saw the Turks as their enemies. When we went to school, we would see Turkist slogans on the blackboard with large letters saying 'Happy are those who call themselves Turks' and 'Long Live Turks.' As a response, we would have to write on the board 'Long Live Kurds and Kurdistan' and 'Happy is the one who says, I am a Kurd.'"

== Republic of Turkey ==
Their relations had already began turning negative towards the end of the Ottoman Empire due to İttihadism. After the Ottoman Empire was defeated and the Treaty of Sèvres was signed, the Turkish National Movement revolted against the treaty and fought to recapture lands taken by Western powers. The Kingdom of Kurdistan declared independence from British Iraq and actively supported the Turkish National Movement. Although the Treaty of Sèvres included the creation of a Kurdish state, the vast majority of Kurds rejected it and chose to fight alongside the Turkish National Movement, with the belief that they were fighting to save the caliphate from infidels. Turkish nationalists often used Pan-Islamist propaganda to attract more Kurds, while also claiming that Kurds had been better than Arabs. Mustafa Kemal Atatürk promised to repay Kurds for their loyalty by giving them full political and cultural rights in his planned state he would establish. In 1923, the Turkish National Movement was victorious and the Treaty of Lausanne was signed, replacing the Treaty of Sèvres and recognising the independence of the Republic of Turkey. Despite the promises made to Kurds, the Turkish state denied the existence of Kurds and began trying to erase their identity. The sudden increase of nationalism among Turks sparked a reactionary rise of nationalism among Kurds. Following the establishment of Turkey and its Turkish nationalist policies, as well as its oppression and denial of Kurds, the Kurdish–Turkish conflict began. Sheikh Said eventually revolted in 1925, stating that "for several years we have been able to read in the newspapers and official documents about the oppression, insults, hatred, and enmity that the Turk Republic accords to the Kurdish notables and dynasties. There is a lot of evidence available from authentic sources that they want to subject the Kurdish elite to the same treatment to which they subjected the Armenians and as a matter of fact, this subject was discussed and decided in parliament last year." The general relations between Turks and Kurds have been negative since the formation of the Republic in 1923. Per article 66 of the Turkish constitution, only ethnic Turks and the Turkish language are recognised. The term Kurdistan was also banned, even though it was never a separatist nor a provocative term at first, and was even used by Turks themself to refer to Kurdish lands, although its usage was and became a taboo as a result of Kemalist reforms. Extreme paranoia also increased in Turkey, where Kurds were often baselessly dragged into many theories, including Sèvres syndrome. The PKK was founded in 1978, during a time period when Anti-Kurdism was very widespread, and any indication of Kurdish identity was punishable by law. Communist and leftist Turks remained tolerant of Kurds. Salafist and Pan-Islamist Turks also remained tolerant of Kurds.

Kurds refused to include Turkish nationalism in their Islamic teachings, causing some Turks who wanted an authentic Islamic education to travel to Kurdistan to begin studies. Islam later became a subject of division, as many Turks ditched mainstream Islamism in favor of the Turkish–Islamic synthesis, an Anti-Kurdish ideology which gave many impressionable Kurdish youth the idea that Islam was also their enemy. Islamists in Turkey, whether Turks or Kurds, were formerly united with the common goal of defeating the Kemalists, however their relations worsened during the tenure of Recep Tayyip Erdoğan, who divided the Islamists on an ethnic basis due to him pushing an Islamist-nationalist rhetoric, with most Islamist Turks being satisfied with him, and most Islamist Kurds opposing him. Some Islamist Turks, such as Alparslan Kuytul, opposed Erdoğan due to his usage of religion to gain voters, his attempts at fusing Turkish nationalism with Islam, and his deliberate exclusion of Kurds in messages about national or religious unity.

== See also ==
- Kurdistan Region–Turkey relations

== Sources ==
- Behâ ed-Din (Baha' ad-Din Yusuf ibn Shaddad), The Life of Saladin, translated at London in 1897 by C.W. Wilson for the Palestine Pilgrims' Text Society
- Humphreys, R. Stephen (1 January 1977). From Saladin to the Mongols: The Ayyubids of Damascus, 1193-1260. SUNY Press. ISBN 978-0-87395-263-7.
- Lock, Peter (2013), The Routledge Companion to the Crusades, Routledge Companions to History, Routledge, ISBN 9781135131371
- Nicholson, H.; et al. (2006), God's Warriors: Knights Templar, Saracens and the Battle for Jerusalem, Osprey Publishing
