= First Battle of Homs =

Battle in Homs

Coordinates: 34.723185°N 36.714462°E

- Part of Mongol invasions of the Levant
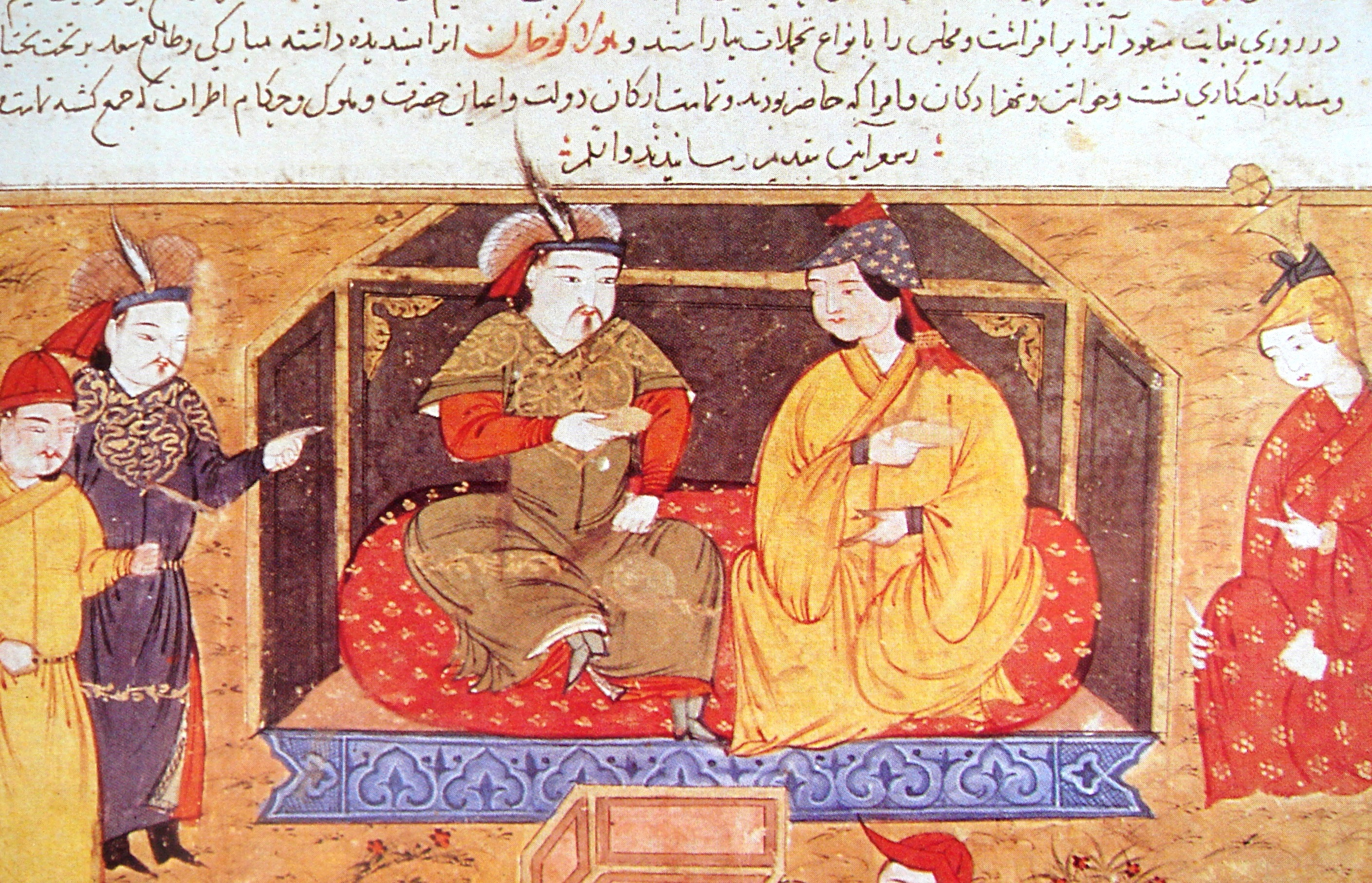
- Hulegu and his wife Dokuz Kathun
| Date | 10 December 1260 |
| Location | Homs |
| Result | Mamluk victory |

Belligerents
| Ilkhanate | Mamluk Egypt; Ayyubid emirate of Homs; Bedouins of Syria. |

Commanders and leaders
| Baidur | Al-Ashraf Musa; Al-Mansur; Zamil b. Ali of Al Fadl |

Strength
| 6,000 men | ~1,400 men |

Casualties and losses
| Heavy | Unknown |

The First Battle of Homs was fought in Homs, Syria, on December 10, 1260, between the Ilkhanids and the Muslim alliance of Syria.

After the Mamluk victory over the Ilkhanids at the Battle of Ain Jalut in September 1260, the whole of Syria, including Aleppo, fell into Mamluk hands. Furious at the defeat of Ain Jalut, Hulagu dispatched another army under Baidar, one of the Kitbuqa generals and a survivor of Ain Jalut. On November, 1260, the Mongol forces managed to recapture Aleppo. Alerted of this, the Ayyubid ruler of Homs, Al-Ashraf Musa, formed a coalition with the Emir of Hama, Al-Mansur, and the Mamluk Emirs of Aleppo.

The Mongol forces encountered the Muslims at Homs, near the tomb of the Arab commander, Khalid ibn al-Walid. The Mongol army consisted of 6,000 men, while the Muslim army had only 1,400 men. The Mongols formed eight formations with a force of 1,000 men at front, while the rest arranged behind it. The Muslims were divided into three groups: the center led by Al-Ashraf, the right under Al-Mansur, and the left under the Emirs of Aleppo.

Little is known about the battle, although Muslim sources state that fog and heat strained the Mongols. In the end, the Muslim coalition emerged victorious in the battle, and the Bedouin leader, Zamil bin Ali, attacked the Mongols from the rear, contributing to the Mongol defeat. The majority of the Mongols were killed or captured.

The victory at Homs increased the confidence of the Muslims against the Mongols, which some Mamluk chronicles considered a more important victory than Ain Jalut. The Ayyubid presence in Syria soon came to an end after this battle.

== See also ==
- Second Battle of Homs (1281)
- Battle of Wadi al-Khazandar (1299/1300)

== Bibliography ==
- Spencer C. Tucker (2019), Middle East Conflicts from Ancient Egypt to the 21st Century.
- Kenneth M. Setton (1969), A History of the Crusades, Vol. II.
- David Abulafia (1995), The New Cambridge Medieval History: Volume 5, C.1198-c.1300.
