= Al-Mujahid =

Ayyubid emir of Homs from 1186 to 1240

Shirkuh II
- Emir of Homs
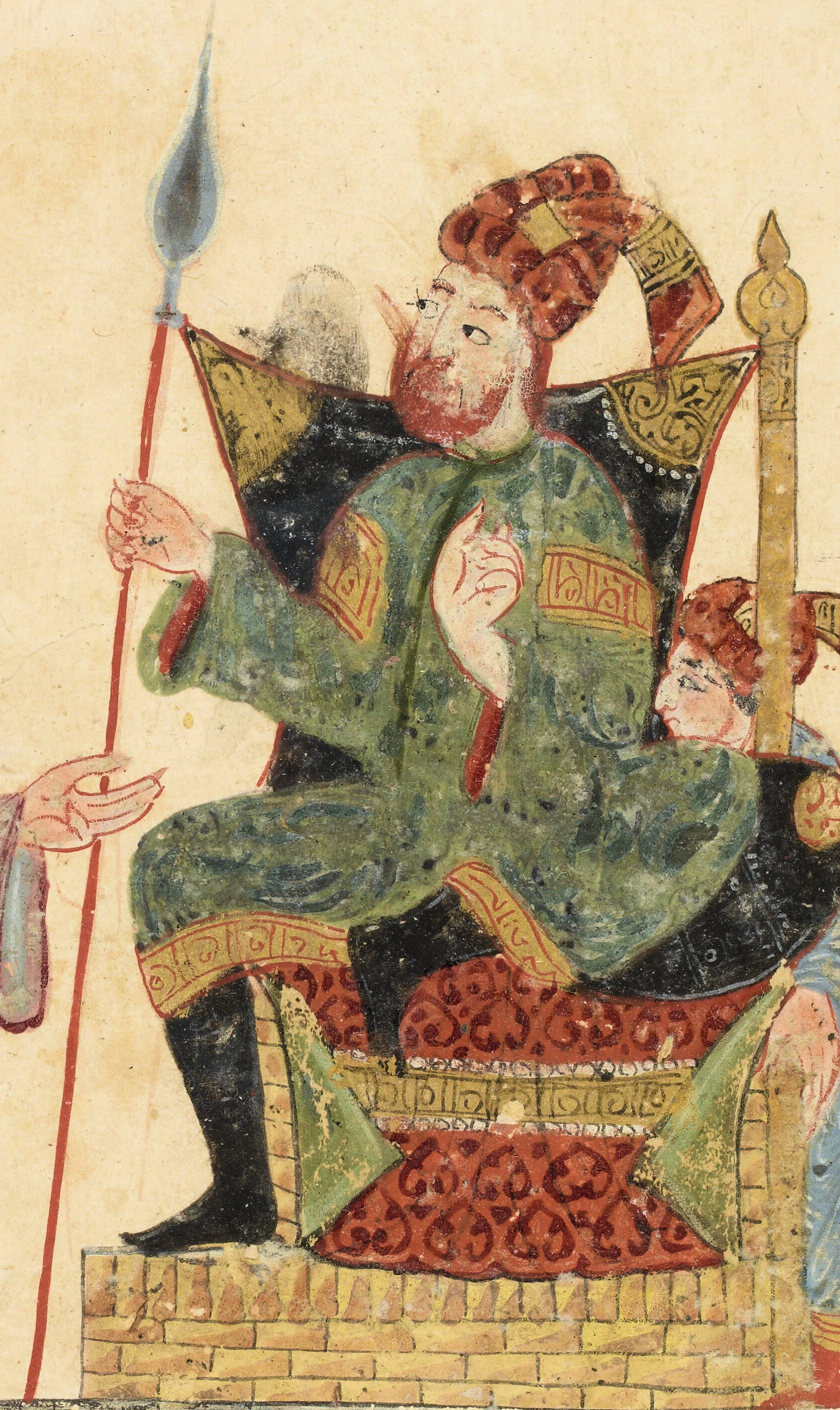
- The Governor of al-Rahba. Ayyubid period. Maqamat of al-Hariri, Baghdad (1237). The red beard denotes foreigness.

Emir of Homs
- Reign: 1186–1240
- Predecessor: Muhammad ibn Shirkuh
- Successor: Al-Mansur Ibrahim
- Born: 1173
- Died: February 1240 (aged 66–67)
- Dynasty: Ayyubid
- Religion: Sunni Islam

Al-Malik Al-Mujahid Asad ad-Din Shirkuh II or Shirkuh II, was the Kurdish Ayyubid emir of Homs from 1186 to 1240. He was the son of An-Nasir Muhammad ibn Shirkuh, grandson of Shirkuh and first cousin once removed of Saladin. His domains also included Palmyra and ar-Rahba. Al-Mujahid became emir at the age of thirteen when his father died unexpectedly in Homs on 4 March 1186 (10 Dhu’l Hijja 581).

== Name ==
The pronunciation and the meaning of Shirkuh is not quite clear: it could mean “the mountain lion” or possibly Shirguh (Sher-gue) in Kurdish “having the lion’s ear".

== Reign ==
=== External threats ===
Within the Ayyubid confederacy Hama was a marcher realm, bordering on the Crusader County of Tripoli and close to the great Hospitaller fortress of Krak des Chevaliers. The role of the emir of Hama was to prevent the Crusaders from raiding into northern Syria, despoiling the land, and threatening Aleppo or Damascus. Frequently Al-Mujahid worked together with his second cousins, the emir Bahramshah of Baalbek and Al-Mansur Muhammad of Hama, to repel Crusader raids and, on occasion, to make forays into Crusader territory. Thus in November 1197 (Muharram 594) Al Mujahid, together with Bahramshah of Baalbek and other emirs, sent forces to relieve the fortress of Toron, which was under siege from Crusader forces from the County of Tripoli. They were unable to drive the Franks off and the siege was not lifted until February 1198 (Rabi’ I 594) when an Egyptian army sent by the Sultan Al-Aziz Uthman drew near. In May 1203 (Ramadan 599) Al Mujahid was directed by the Sultan Al-Adil to support a campaign by Al Mansur of Hama to attack Krak des Chevalliers and in the spring of 1207 (603) he took part in a campaign led by Al-Adil I to punish the Hospitallers for their constant raiding. The Ayyubid force laid siege to Tripoli, but eventually agreed to withdraw in return for the payment of tribute. In 1214-15 (611) both Al Mujahid of Homs and Al Mansur of Hama were threatened by a major incursion led by the Hospitallers, until Az-Zahir Ghazi put pressure on Hospitallers to leave them alone. In 1229 or 1230 (627) al Mujahid was victorious over the Hospitallers of Krak des Chevalliers at the battle of Afnun, a village between Bar’in and Hama, and many Franks were taken captive.

=== Major campaigns ===
Al Mujahid appears to have been an energetic military leader and he is recorded as having taken part in six major campaigns in which the various Ayyubid rulers combined their forces to attack external enemies. In a seventh major campaign the forces of Homs were led by his son, Al-Mansur Ibrahim. However Al-Mujahid’s behaviour during the campaign of 1234 (631) into the lands of the Sultanate of Rum was quite remarkable. He spread a rumour that if Sultan Al-Kamil was successful in conquering territory, he would oblige the other Ayyubid rulers to exchange their existing realms for new ones in Anatolia, leaving Al-Kamil in control of both Egypt and Syria. As a result, morale was low on the campaign, which was driven back by Ala ad-Din Kayqubad. The campaign of 1235 (633) was more successful, and Al-Mujahid joined Al-Kamil once again as they took Edessa and Harran.

=== Internal struggles ===
On the death of Saladin in 1193, there was a power struggle between his sons Al-Afdal and Al-Aziz Uthman. Al Mujahid took part in the family conference held that year to try and resolve the differences between them. Some years later, in 1228-29 (626) he also took part in the siege of Damascus, which resulted in the removal of an-Nasir Dawud and the installation of Al-Ashraf. Some years later Al Mujahid was one of the leading elements of a coalition of Syrian Ayyubid rulers who sought to oust Sultan Al-Kamil of Egypt. However, in September 1237 (Muharram 635) the coalition’s leader, Al-Ashraf of Damascus, died, leaving his allies dangerously exposed. Enlisting the help of Al Mujahid’s neighbour, Al-Muzaffar Mahmud of Hama, Al Kamil embarked on a military expedition to remove Al Mujahid from Homs. Al Kamil was only persuaded to desist from attacking Homs in return for a payment of 2 million dirhams. A few weeks later, Al Kamil suddenly died, on 11 March 1238 (23 Rajab 635).

=== Conflict with Hama ===
In 1219 (616) there was a succession crisis in the neighbouring emirate of Hama when emir Al-Mansur Muhammad died. His second son, An-Nasir Kilich Arslan succeeded in usurping power before his older brother, the rightful heir Al-Muzaffar II Mahmud, could take the initiative. In consequence Al-Muzaffar had to wait nine years before he could assume the title of Emir, and was only able to do so because a conference organised by Al-Mujahid at Tall Ajul near Gaza established the terms on which other Ayyubid rulers would recognise him. One of these terms was that Al-Mujahid should receive the fief of Salamiyah. However, on taking control of the town, Al Mujahid built a great fortress nearby, which the ruler of Hama interpreted as a threat to him. This led to bad relations between the emirs, and when Al-Muzaffar joined Al-Kamil of Egypt in a campaign to oust Al-Mujahid, the tensions between them broke out into open conflict. When Al-Kamil died Al-Mujahid attacked the territory of Hama, devastating the countryside and diverting both the River Orontes and the canals which irrigated the fields around the city. However, he was unable to take the city, resulting in ongoing tensions and aggression between the two rulers for the remainder of their days.

In the diplomatic manoeuvres which followed the death of Al-Kamil, the emir of Hama, Al-Mujahid’s old foe Al-Muzaffar, allied himself with As-Salih Ayyub and persuaded him that he could usefully secure his position in Syria before attacking Egypt by removing Al-Mujahid from Homs. In March 1239 (Sha’ban 636) As-Salih Ayyub set out with his forces to attack Homs, but soon after he received envoys from Egypt complaining of the rule of Al-Adil II and urging him to come and take power himself. In response, during April 1239 As-Salih Ayyub turned away from Homs and moved his forces south in preparation for an invasion of Egypt. As the threat receded, Al-Mujahid conspired with As-Salih Ayyub’s uncle, As-Salih Ismail, to take Damascus and divide the Syrian domains between them. Their forces took Damascus on 28 September 1239 (27 Safar 637).

== Death ==
Before Al Mujahid could benefit from the seizure of Damascus, he died in February 1240 (Rajab 637). He had ruled Homs for a remarkable 54 years, and during this time Homs was probably the most stable of the Ayyubid states. He was succeeded by his son Al-Mansur Ibrahim.

== Sources ==
- Minorsky, Vladimir (1953). Studies in Caucasian History. New York: Taylor’s Foreign Press. ISBN 0-521-05735-3.
- Contadini, Anna (1 January 2012). A World of Beasts: A Thirteenth-Century Illustrated Arabic Book on Animals (the Kitāb Na't al-Ḥayawān) in the Ibn Bakhtīshū' Tradition. Brill. doi:10.1163/9789004222656_005.
