= Al-Muzaffar Mahmud =

Al-Muzaffar Mahmud may refer to:

- Al-Muzaffar II Mahmud, Ayyubid emir of Hama (1229–1244)
- Al-Muzaffar III Mahmud, Ayyubid emir of Hama (1284–1300)
