= Al-Mansur II Muhammad =

Ayyubid emir of Hama from 1244 to 1284

- Emir of Hama
- Reign: 1244–1284
- Predecessor: Al-Muzaffar II Mahmud
- Successor: Al-Muzaffar III Mahmud
- Born: 1214
- Died: 1284 (aged 69–70)
- Dynasty: Ayyubid
- Religion: Sunni Islam
- Military career
- Allegiance: Ayyubids
- Branch: Ayyubid army (Mamluk regiments)
- Service years: c. 1260 – 1280
- Conflicts: Battle of Ain Jalut

Al-Mansur II Muhammad was the Ayyubid emir of Hama 1244–1284, son of al-Muzaffar II Mahmud and grandson of al-Mansur I Muhammad. He was the great-great grandson of Saladin’s brother Nur ad-Din Shahanshah. His mother was Ghaziya Khatun.

== Early years ==
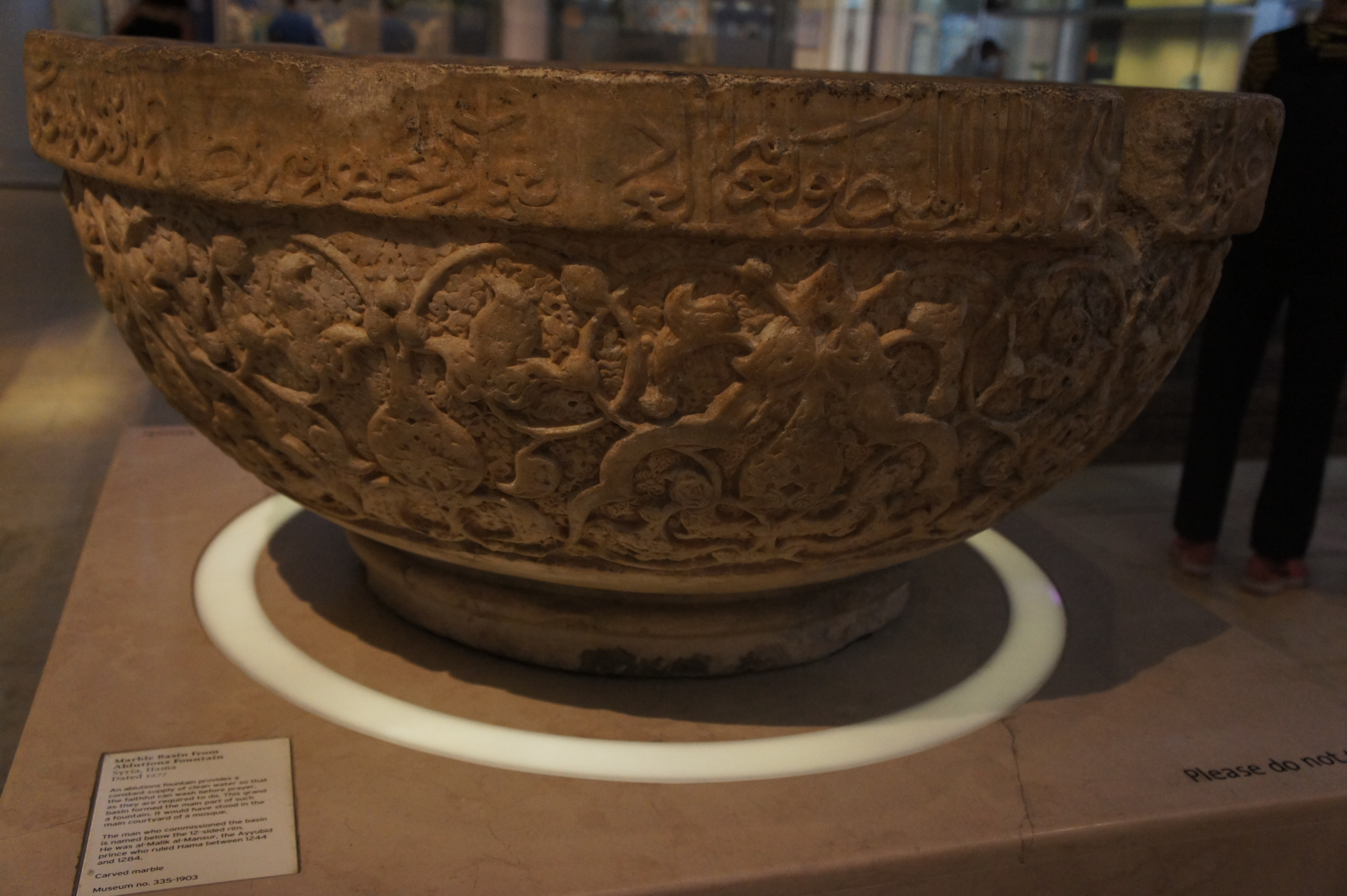
Marble basin from Hama, commissioned by Al-Mansur Muhammad II. Presently in the Victoria and Albert Museum, London

Al Mansur came to the throne at a time when the Egyptian Sultan As-Salih Ayyub was consolidating his power. In spring 1247 As-Salih Ayyub set out for Syria where he met emir Al-Ashraf Musa of Homs as well as Al Mansur. Both were young - Al-Ashraf Musa was eighteen and Al Mansur was just twelve - and new on their thrones. As-Salih Ayyub campaigned against his rival An-Nasir Yusuf of Aleppo but returned to Egypt to confront a new Crusader threat in 1249. Shortly afterwards he died. His son and successor Al-Muazzam Turanshah did not long outlive him and in 1250 the Ayyubid dynasty was overthrown in Egypt by the Bahri mamluks.

== Threats from Mamluks and Mongols ==
The effect of this coup in Egypt was to make An-Nasir Yusuf of Aleppo the senior Ayyubid ruler, and Al Mansur joined the other minor emirs in the army he assembled to invade Egypt. The Ayyubid army went down to a disastrous defeat at Al-Salihiyya outside Cairo. This exposed An-Nasir and all of the other emirs who had supported him to the dangers of a Mamluk invasion of Syria, and in the following years the Mamluks steadily expanded their power over Palestine and the southern portions of Syria. At the same time, the Mongols were emerging as a serious threat in the East, and took Baghdad in 1258. In September 1259 (Ramadan 657) Hulagu Khan launched his long-awaited invasion of Syria. Crossing the Euphrates, Hulagu first laid siege to Aleppo in January 1260 (Safar 658), which unwisely declined his offer to let it surrender. The Mongols stormed the city after a brief siege, and laid waste to it without mercy. Needing no further warning, Al-Mansur sent an embassy to Hulagu to plead for the lives and livelihoods of the people of Hama. Hulagu agreed to spare the city, and sent a Persian official named Khusraushah to rule the city as his viceregent.

The other Ayyubid emirates in Syria all quickly submitted to the Mongols around the same time, although they continued to scheme with each other and with the Mamluks to try and organise a military coalition to drive the Mongols back. Al-Mansur was closely allied with An-Nasir Yusuf, ruler of Damascus, who fled before the Mongols arrived and headed for Egypt with Al-Mansur in attendance, where he now hoped to form an alliance with the Mamluks to drive the Mongols out and restore himself to paramountcy in Syria. However, as he approached the encampment of the Mamluk general Qutuz he began to mistrust him and lost faith in the alliance he had proposed. Cornered between the Mongols heading south and the Mamluks heading north, he entrusted his family to Al-Mansur, handed over command of his troops to him, and directed him to join Qutuz in his camp. An-Nasir himself with his brother and son remained behind and he was captured by Mongol skirmishers and sent back to Hulagu as a prisoner.

== Mamluk Restoration ==
In obeying Am-Nasir Yusuf and joining the Mamluk army, Al-Mansur took a decisive step which was to restore him to Hama, albeit under Mamluk suzerainty. The Mamluk army headed north to Ain Jalut where they inflicted a decisive defeat on the Mongols, turning back their invasion in a way which was almost unprecedented in the Mongol experience. Al Mansur served with distinction during the battle, and was restored to his domains in Hama as a Mamluk vassal. His loyalty thereafter to the Mamluks meant that while the other Ayyubid states were gradually absorbed by them over the next few years, Hama remained under Ayyubid rule until 1341, longer than any other Syrian city.

Al Mansur ruled until 1284, when he was succeeded by his son Al-Muzaffar III Mahmud. Al Mansur’s sister was betrothed to the Mamluk Faris ad-Din Aktai who was murdered by the Mamluk Sultan Aybak because he was too much of a threat to his rule.
