= Al-Afdal Muhammad =

Ayyubid emir of Hama from 1332 to 1341

- Emir of Hama
- Reign: 1332–1341
- Predecessor: Abu'l-Fida
- Successor: –
- Died: 1341
- Dynasty: Ayyubid
- Religion: Sunni Islam

Al-Afdal Muhammad (Arabic: الأفضل محمد) was the last Ayyubid governor of Hama, in central Syria, reigning from 1332 to 1341. He was the son and successor of Abu'l-Fida, and a descendant of Saladin's brother Nur al-Din Shahanshah. After the Mamluk defeat of the Mongols in 1260 at the Battle of Ain Jalut, Hama was restored as a tributary emirate and a succession of Ayyubid rulers governed the city. However, al-Afdal incurred the displeasure of his Mamluk overlords and was deposed by them in 1341 ending Ayyubid rule over the city of Hama and bringing it under direct Mamluk authority.

== Bibliography ==
- Abu-Lughod, Janet L.; Dumper, Michael (2007), Cities of the Middle East and North Africa: A Historical Encyclopedia, ABC-CLIO, ISBN 978-1-57607-919-5
- Lane-Poole, Stanley (2004), The Mohammedan Dynasties: Chronological and Genealogical Tables with Historical Introductions, Kessinger Publishing, ISBN 978-1-4179-4570-2
