= Battle of the Spring of Harod =

The Battle of the Spring of Harod may refer to:

- Israelite-Midianite battle at the Well of Harod (late Bronze Age), see Gideon#Biblical_narrative
- Battle of Ain Jalut (3 September 1260)
