= Kurdistan Region–Turkey relations =

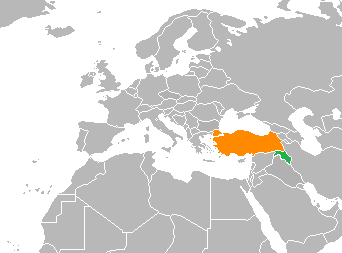
- Kurdistan Region: Turkey

Turkey's historic relationship with Iraq and Kurdistan Region has wavered between indifference and courtship, but the constant has been a layer of mistrust emanating from both ends that appears to have been set aside in 2001 when the new Turkish government reversed the status quo and embraced a policy of engagement that has successfully catapulted the country to becoming a leading economic player in the Middle East.

== Historical background ==
Saddam Hussein's decision to invade Kuwait in the summer of 1990 created a dilemma for Turkish foreign policy, which President Özal resolved by supporting the anti-Iraq coalition led by the United States. Özal's foreign policy opponents feared not only the loss of significant Iraqi trade and energy, but also the potential breakup of Iraq following an allied victory, which could catalyze the formation of an independent Kurdistan, which they feared would provide additional sanctuary for the PKK, and inspire the ethnic Kurds of southeastern Anatolia to fight for independence as well.

During the war, millions of Kurds fled across the border seeking sanctuary in Turkey. The United States mounted Operation Provide Comfort to provide safety to the Kurds by preventing Iraqi forces from operating north of the 36th parallel. The return of the Iraqi Kurds to northern Iraq under protection of the US Air Force created a de facto autonomous Kurdish region in northern Iraq

Starting with the new direction subsequently taken by Turkish foreign policy under Ahmet Davutoğlu, Turkey engaged in active diplomacy and economic interdependence that sought "zero problems" with Turkey's neighbours.

Even though it remains wary regarding the development of an independent Kurdistan in northern Iraq, Turkey benefits from the exportation of oil from Kirkuk through the pipeline to Ceyhan as well as continued oil exploration.

== Economic relations ==
Following this cooperation, Turkey–Iraqi Kurdistan trade has grown by approximately 900% since 2002, a very dramatic increase given the lack of growth in the pre-2002 era. Turkey exports more to Iraq ($7.637 billion in 2016, equivalent to 5.36% of total exports) than to any other MENA state, yet it only imported $836.3 million of goods and services in that year (0.4% of imports), leading to a trade surplus of $6.8 billion, its largest with a MENA state.

Because the KRG's roughly 600,000 barrels per day of oil exports are piped almost exclusively through Turkey to the port of Ceyhan, Ankara has enormous leverage not only over the region's economy, but over the resource-distribution systems underlying social stability, such as the government's ability to pay salaries.

== Cultural relations ==
Turkish television drama have become widely popular across in Kurdistan Region, as millions of Kurds and Arabs watch episodes of shows such as Hareem Al Sultan and Fatima daily, helping to promote a positive image of Turkey in Kurdistan Region.

== See also ==
- Foreign relations of Kurdistan Region
- Foreign relations of Turkey
- Kurdish–Turkish relations
