= Al-Aziz Uthman ibn al-Adil =

Ayyubid ruler of Banyas from 1218 to 1233

Al-ʿAzīz ʿUthmān ibn al-ʿĀdil (died 20 June 1233) was the Ayyubid ruler of Banyas from 1218 until his death.

== Life ==
Al-ʿAzīz ʿUthmān was a younger son of Sultan al-ʿĀdil I. He was granted Banyas as an iqṭāʿ (fief) by his elder brother, al-Muʿaẓẓam, perhaps in 1218. In 1219, with ʿIzz al-Dīn Aybak, he was left in charge of al-Muʿaẓẓam's Syrian principality when the latter went to join the Sultan al-Kāmil in Egypt against the Fifth Crusade. When al-Muʿaẓẓam decided to raze the walls of Jerusalem, he protested unsuccessfully that he was able to defend the city. After al-Muʿaẓẓam dismantled all of his fortresses west of the Jordan River, he gave the territory to al-ʿAzīz ʿUthmān. This included the former crusader castles of Beaufort, Chastel Neuf and Toron.

During the Sixth Crusade, in February or March 1228, al-ʿAzīz ʿUthmān ambushed a group of crusaders near Tyre. He killed or captured some seventy horsemen in one of the few military actions of the crusade. Later that year, he entered a conspiracy to seize Baalbek from Bahrām Shāh. Failing that, he attempted to take the town by siege until ordered to desist by his nephew, al-Nāṣir Dāʾūd. This caused a rift between the two and al-ʿAzīz joined al-Kāmil with the army of Banyas at Nablus in August 1228, when the sultan was preparing to dispossess al-Nāṣir. At this time, al-Kāmil may have recognized al-ʿAzīz as autonomous in Banyas. Thereafter, he would cease to owe his position to the ruler of Damascus. Already by 1226, al-ʿAzīz had begun to call himself al-sultan in his inscriptions.

In the negotiations that followed, al-ʿAzīz ʿUthmān acquired Baalbek. Following the siege of Damascus in June 1229, however, his brother al-Ashraf refused to hand it over. This betrayal did not cause a permanent rift. In 1230, al-ʿAzīz joined al-Ashraf's army that defeated the Khwarazmshah Jalāl al-Dīn at the battle of Yasi-chimen on 9 August. He was also present at the brief siege of Amida in 1232.

Al-ʿAzīz ʿUthmān died not long after this last campaign, on 10 Ramaḍān 630 AH (20 June 1233). He was succeeded in Banyas by his eldest son, al-Ẓāhir Ghāzī, who soon died and was succeeded by a younger son, al-Ṣaʿīd Ḥasan.

== Bibliography ==
- Humphreys, R. Stephen (1977). From Saladin to the Mongols: The Ayyubids of Damascus, 1193–1260. State University of New York Press.
