= Tughtakin ibn Ayyub =

Ayyubid emir of Yemen and Hejaz from 1182 to 1197

Sayf al-Islam Tughtakin Ahmad
- Al-Malik al-Aziz

Emir of Yemen and Arabia
- Reign: 1182–1197
- Predecessor: Turan-Shah
- Successor: Ismail ibn Tughtekin
- Died: August/September 1197; Zabid, Yemen
Names
- Al-Malik al-Aziz Zahir al-Din Sayf al-Islam Tughtakin Ahmad ibn Ayyub
- Dynasty: Ayyubid
- Father: Najm ad-Din Ayyub
- Religion: Sunni Islam

Al-Malik al-Aziz Zahir al-Din Sayf al-Islam Tughtakin Ahmad ibn Ayyub (Arabic: الملك العزيز سيف الإسلام طغتكين أحمد ابن أيوب; also known simply as Sayf al-Islam) was a Kurdish Ayyubid emir (prince) of Yemen and Arabia between 1182 and 1197.

== Early life ==
Tughtakin was the youngest son of Najm ad-Din Ayyub and his brothers included Saladin, the founder of the Ayyubid Empire and al-Adil, the later sultan of Egypt. After Saladin overthrew the Fatimid Caliphate of Egypt, Tughtakin acquired lands in the Adawiya district near Cairo that belonged to Christian churches, most likely through force. The area contained yellow clay quarries that were renowned in the region. Tughtakin had houses built in Adawiya as well as the planting of gardens. The former Fatimid head for the Diwan al-Nazar ("Office of Inspection") entered the service of Tughtakin while he was in Egypt.

== Emir of Yemen ==
Following the departure of Tughtakin's brother Turan-Shah from Yemen in 1182 as a result of country-wide rebellions, Tughtakin was assigned the governor, or emir, of Yemen that year. Prior to his appointment, he sent a letter to Saladin seeking the post. Based in Zabid, Tughtakin successfully solidified Ayyubid rule throughout Yemen.

He had a wall with four gates (Saham, Ghulafiqah, al-Shubariq and al-Qurtub) built around Zabid during his reign. At Ta'izz, the major parts of the city's fortress were rebuilt. Under his reign, and that of his predecessor, Aden was the only city in Yemen to mint gold coins. In Mecca Tughtakin had dinar and dirham coins minted with the name of Saladin. The principal commercial transit area for imported goods in Aden was founded by Tughtakin and called Dar al-Sa'ada.

During Turan-Shah's reign, a system of marine patrols to guard merchant ships was instituted, as was the consequent "galley tax", an imposition for this protection. However, the warships were docked on the beaches for most of the time until Tughtakin's reign. When he was questioned as to how he would collect the galley tax, Tughtakin initially implied he would do so by force like any other ruler, but he was advised by his aides to instead put the galleys to use. Tughtakin embraced his aides' idea and dispatched his warships to protect mercantile goods from pirate raids and to monitor maritime traffic. Galleys would be sent as far as India.

According to the medieval Muslim chronicler Ibn al-Athir, Tughtakin attempted to wrest control of Mecca, but after protests from the Abbasid caliph al-Nasir, Saladin intervened and prevented Tughtakin from seizing the city. Ibn al-Athir wrote that Tughtakin was "a stern ruler, harsh to his subjects, one who used to buy merchants' goods for himself and sell them at whatever price he wished".

== Death ==
Tughtakin died in Zabid in August or September 1197. His son al-Muizz Ismail succeeded him, but was killed on 17 January 1202, after which he was succeeded by a mamluk (slave soldier) of his younger brother an-Nasir Ayyub.

== Bibliography ==
- Houtsma, Martijn Theodoor; Wensinck, A.J. (1993), E.J. Brill's First Encyclopaedia of Islam, 1913–1936, BRILL, ISBN 90-04-09796-1
- Ibn al-Mujawir, Yusuf ibn Ya'qub (2008), Smith, Gerald Rex (ed.), A Traveller in Thirteenth-Century Arabia: Ibn Al-Mujāwir's Tārīkh Al-Mustabṣir, vol. 33, Ashgate Publishing, ISBN 9780904180916
- Lev, Yaacov (1999). Saladin in Egypt. Leiden, Boston, Köln: Brill. ISBN 90-04-11221-9.
- Macdonald, Michael (2003), Proceedings of the Seminar for Arabian Studies, vol. 33, Archaeopress, ISBN 9780754669524
- Margariti, Roxani Eleni (2007). Aden & The Indian Ocean Trade. University of North Carolina Press. ISBN 978-0807830765.
- Richards, Donald S. (2010), The Chronicle of Ibn al-Athir for the Crusading Period from al-Kamil fi'l-Ta'rikh. Part 3, Ashgate Publishing, ISBN 9780754669524
