= Second Battle of Homs =

1281 battle between Mamluks and Mongols

Coordinates: 34.723185°N 36.714462°E

- Part of the Mongol invasions of the Levant
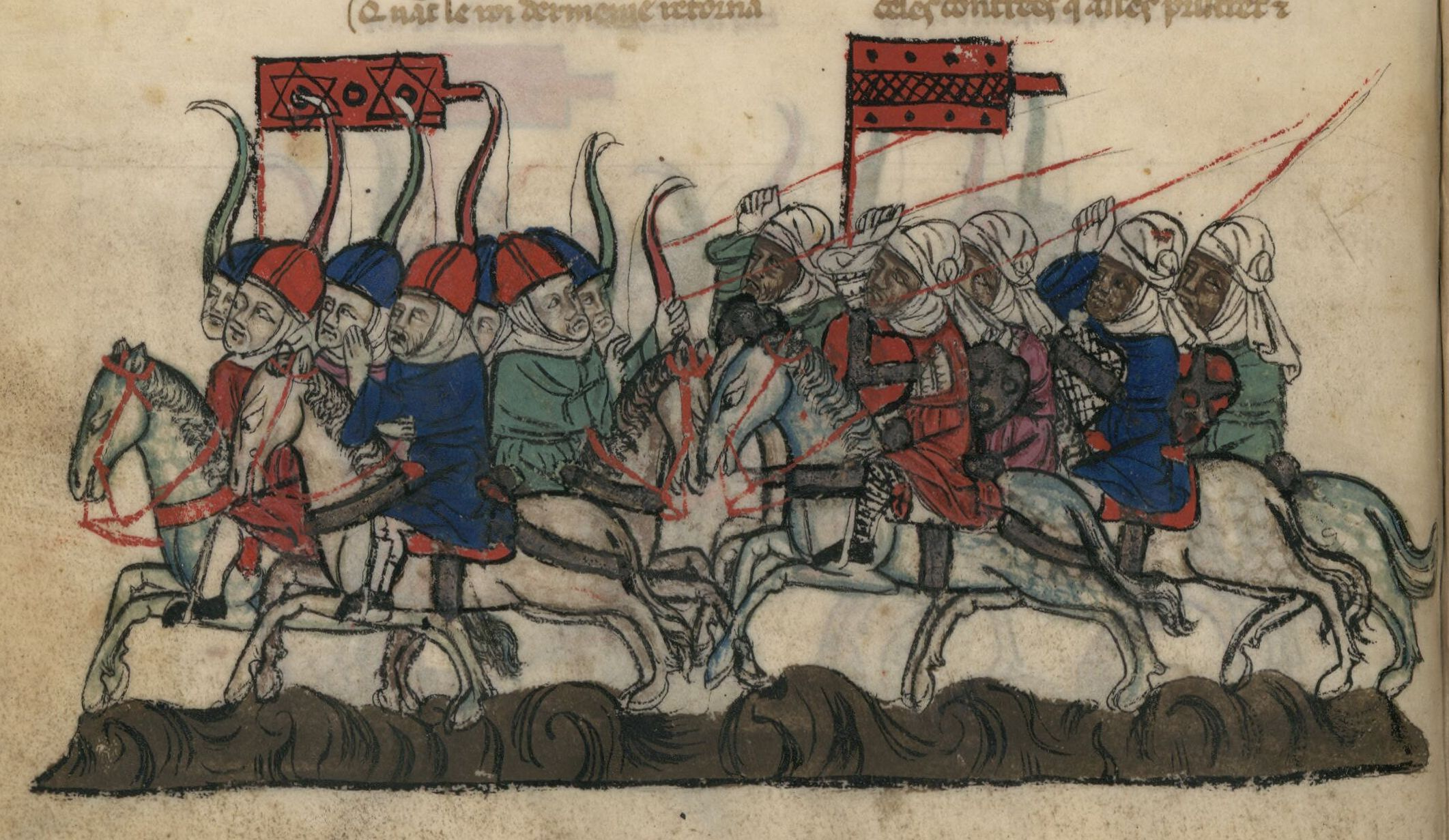
- Retreat of the Mongols (left), 14th-century miniature
Date	29 October 1281
Location	Homs
Result	Mamluk victory

Belligerents
Ilkhanate: Cilician Armenia; Kingdom of Georgia; Sultanate of Rum; Knights Hospitaller	Mamluk Sultanate

Commanders and leaders
(Ilkhanate) Möngke Temür (WIA); Leo II (Kingdom of Georgia) Demetrius II	Qalawun; Sayf al-Din Salar; Shafi' bin Ali el-Masry (WIA)

Units involved
Mongol cavalry; Armenian, Georgian, and Seljuk auxiliaries; Frankish mercenaries	Heavy cavalry; Light cavalry; Infantry

Strength
40,000–50,000: 30,000 Armenians, Georgians, and Greeks; ~200 Hospitaller Knights of Marqab	30,000: 800 Royal Mamluks; 4,000+ Halqa; 4,000+ Bedouin

Casualties and losses
Very heavy losses	Very heavy losses

The Second Battle of Homs was fought in western Syria on 29 October 1281, between the armies of the Mamluk dynasty of Egypt and the Ilkhanate, a division of the Mongol Empire centered on Iran. The battle was part of Abaqa Khan's attempt at taking Syria from the Egyptians.

== Background ==
After the Mongols' defeat by the Mamluks in the Battle of Albistan in 1277 and their subsequent withdrawal from Syria, the situation was by no means settled. The Mongols, led by the Ilkhanid ruler Abaqa Khan and later by his successor Ahmed Tekuder, continued to regard Syria as part of their political and military sphere of interest. The region was of strategic importance to the Mongols, as it formed a bridge to the Mediterranean region on the one hand and served as a buffer zone against the Mamluks, who had established themselves as the dominant power in the Middle East after their victories, on the other.

== Prelude ==
With the death of Baybars the Mamluks saw several internal succession disputes. Qalawun al-Alfi ultimately prevailed and ascended the throne on November 27, 1279, under the title al-Malik al-Mansur. Qalawun's rule was immediately challenged by the revolt of a rival Mamluk emir, Sunqur al-Ashqar, who proclaimed himself independent sultan in Damascus. Sunqur initially gained the support of local rulers, but suffered defeat at the hands of Qalawun's troops, whereupon he turned to the Ilkhanids under Abagha Khan for help.

In 1280, the Il-khan Abaqa sent his brother Möngke Temur at the head of a large army which numbered about 40-50,000 men, chiefly Armenians under Leo II and Georgians under Demetrius II. Homs was the first time that the Mamluks faced the Mongol army at full strength.

On 20 October 1280, the Mongols took Aleppo, pillaging the markets and burning the mosques. The Muslim inhabitants fled for Damascus, where the Mamluk leader Qalawun assembled his forces.

== Battle ==
On 29 October 1281, the two armies met south of Homs, a city in western Syria. In a pitched battle, the Mongols, Armenians, Georgians and Oirats under King Leo II and Mongol generals routed and scattered the Mamluk left flank, but the center and right flank of the Mamluks personally led by Sultan Qalawun destroyed the Mongol centre. Möngke Temur was wounded and fled, followed by his disorganized Mongol army. However, Qalawun chose to not pursue the defeated enemy, and the Armenian-Georgian auxiliaries of the Mongols managed to withdraw safely.

== Aftermath ==
The following year, Abaqa died and his successor, Tekuder, reversed his policy towards the Mamluks. He converted to Islam and forged an alliance with the Mamluk sultan.

According to Nicholas Morton, the Battle of Homs was an important turning point in the expansion of the Mongol Empire, as it was the first time that a full-scale Mongol invasion was repelled on the western frontier.

== See also ==
- First Battle of Homs (1260)

== Bibliography ==
- Amitai-Preiss, Reuven (1995). Mongols and Mamluks: The Mamluk-Ilkhanid War, 1260–1281. Cambridge: Cambridge University Press. ISBN 978-0-521-46226-6.
- Burns, Ross (2016). Aleppo, A History. Routledge. ISBN 9780415737210.
- Richard, Jean (1999). The Crusades, C. 1071-c. 1291. Cambridge University Press. ISBN 0-521-62566-1.
- Riley-Smith, Jonathan (2012). The Knights Hospitaller in the Levant, c.1070-1309. Springer. ISBN 9781137264756.
- Waterson, James (2007). The Knights of Islam: The Wars of the Mamluks. London: Greenhill Books. ISBN 978-1-85367-734-2.
