= Al-Mansur Ibrahim =

Ayyubid emir of Homs from 1240 to 1246

Al-Mansur Ibrahim المنصور ابراهيم
- Emir of Homs
- Reign: 1240–1246
- Coronation: 1240
- Predecessor: Al-Mujahid
- Successor: Al-Ashraf Musa
- Born: Homs, Syria
- Died: June 28, 1246; Nayrab, Syria
- Nasir ad-Din al-Malik al-Mansur Ibrahim bin Asad ad-Din Shirkuh
- Dynasty: Ayyubid
- Father: Al-Mujahid
- Religion: Sunni Islam

Nasir ad-Din al-Malik al-Mansur Ibrahim bin Asad ad-Din Shirkuh, better known as al-Mansur Ibrahim, (Arabic: المنصور إبراهيم d. June 28, 1246) was a Kurdish ruler, the emir ("governor") of the Homs principality from 1240 to 1246 under the Ayyubid dynasty. He held Homs with relative independence, but initially as under the command of as-Salih Ismail of Damascus. He would later fight against as-Salih Ismail and his Khwarezemid allies—al-Mansur confronted the latter in 1241, 1242, 1244, and 1246. Mervani State's expedition to Armenia

== Military campaigns ==
In January 1241, al-Mansur was appointed commander-in-chief of the allied Ayyubid-Seljuk forces, and pursued any Khwarezimid army that crossed the Euphrates, pillaging several Syrian towns. Al-Mansur caught up with them at Raqqa, but could not prevent them from retreating back to their base in Harran to regroup. On April 25, al-Mansur managed to draw the Khwarezemids into a pitched battle near Edessa and defeated them decisively. Surviving Khwarezemid soldiers fled to Harran where they gathered their families and moved south to territory controlled by the Abbasid Caliphate. Most of the captured territory was taken by the Ayyubids of Aleppo and the Seljuks, but al-Mansur annexed al-Khabur and Qarqisiyya to his own principality. He joined forces with the Seljuk army and together they overwhelmed the fortress of Amid held by the sultan as-Salih Ayyub who attempted to hold Syria and al-Jazira for his Ayyubid Egypt. In al-Mansur's campaign, all of Ayyub's possessions, except for Hisn Kayfa, were taken.

In August 1242, al-Mansur again defeated a Khwarezemid expeditionary force in the Aleppo area. In 1243, as-Salih Ayyub attempted to secure a peace agreement with as-Salih Ismail establishing an-Nasir Dawud who held Transjordan as the common enemy, and thus al-Mansur was required to recognize the former as sultan. As-Salih Ismail sent him to besiege an-Nasir's fortress at Ajlun. In 1244, Egypt and Syria again broke ties, and al-Mansur joined as-Salih Ismail's federation. They advanced towards Egypt, with as-Salih Ismail heading for Gaza, an-Nasir Dawud for Jerusalem, while al-Mansur proceeded towards Acre. Before al-Mansur reached the city, the Khwarezemids again crossed the Euphrates into Ayyubid territory. Al-Mansur left to fight them, but in the resulting Battle of La Forbie his army was overwhelmed and he narrowly escaped with a few followers.

The Khwarezemids, with the aid of Jamiul of Salkhad besieged Damascus in March 1246 and were joined by as-Salih Arif Ismail who now held Baalbek. The siege was so severe that the inhabitants were reported to have been feeding on carrion and dogs. However, al-Mansur and an-Nasir Yusuf of Aleppo made an alliance and decided to confront the Khwarwezmids, who they feared could take control of Syria should they seize Damascus. The prospect troubled al-Mansur especially since relieving Damascus would strengthen the grip of his enemy as-Salih Ayyub in southern Syria. Nonetheless, al-Mansur led a force of Turkmen and Bedouin mercenaries towards Damascus. The Khwarezemids and their allies met al-Mansur near Lake Homs where they were dealt a major defeat, ending Khwarezemid power in Syria forever. Afterward, al-Mansur moved on to Baalbek which was defended by as-Salih Ismail's son al-Manssur Mahmud. Al-Mansur Ibrahim overran the outer town with ease, but retreated after reaching its formidable citadel and returned to Homs.

== Death ==
At this point, as-Salih Ayyub invited al-Mansur to Egypt, possibly pursuant to an agreement granting him Damascus. He did not hesitate to accept the invitation, but by the time he reached Damascus he was reported to be gravely ill. He died in the Ghouta town of Nayrab on June 28, 1246, and was succeeded by his son al-Ashraf Musa. Under al-Mansur, Homs, the smallest Ayyubid principality, wielded great influence in imperial affairs, but with his demise, it returned to its accustomed passivity.

== Bibliography ==
- Humphreys, R. Stephen (1977), From Saladin to the Mongols: The Ayyubids of Damascus, 1193-1260, SUNY Press, ISBN 0-87395-263-4
- Hawting, Gerald R. (2005), Muslims, Mongols and crusaders: an anthology of articles published in the Bulletin of the School of Oriental and African Studies, Routledge, ISBN 0-7007-1393-X
- Setton, Kenneth Meyer (1975), A History of the Crusades, University of Wisconsin Press, ISBN 0-299-06670-3
