= Ismail ibn Tughtekin =

Ayyubid ruler of Yemen (died c. 1201)

Al-Malik al-Mu'izz wa-Shams al-Muluk
- Ismail ibn Tughtekin
- Died: 18 Rajab 598 AH / 599 AH; Zabid, Yemen
Names
- Ismail ibn Tughtekin ibn Ayyūb ibn Shādhi
- Dynasty: Ayyubid
- Father: Tughtakin ibn Ayyub
- Religion: Sunni Islam

Al-Mu'izz Fath al-Din Ismail ibn Sayf al-Islam Tughtekin ibn Ayyūb ibn Shādhi, known by the titles al-Malik al-Mu'izz (the Glorifying King) and Shams al-Muluk (Sun of Kings), was the Ayyubid ruler of Yemen who was killed in 598 AH (c. 1201–1202 CE) after controversially claiming the caliphate. A member of the Kurdish Ayyubid dynasty, he was the son of the ruler of Yemen Tughtakin ibn Ayyub, and the brother of al-Malik al-Nasir Ayyub. He was a distinguished poet with a collected diwan (poetry anthology). He founded the school known as al-Miyalayn in the city of Zabid, and is considered the first person to establish madrasas (educational institutions) in Yemen.

== Early life and exile ==
Al-Mu'izz was notorious for his indulgence in entertainment and drinking, which led his father to exile him to the Hejaz. When his father died on 19 Shawwal 593 AH (c. 1197 CE) in al-Mansura, his father's mamluk Buzba whom his father had appointed as his deputy while on his deathbed dispatched Jamal al-Dawla Kafur to inform al-Mu'izz of his father's passing. Al-Mu'izz had been estranged from his father and had intended to join his uncles in Egypt. The messengers reached him while he was still on the road near Harad, upon receiving the news, he cut his hair and donned black garments as a sign of grief, before returning to take control of Yemen.

== Rule in Yemen ==
Upon assuming power in Yemen, al-Mu'izz moved swiftly to consolidate his authority. He ordered the execution of Buzba and a number of his father's mamluks, then confronted and defeated the leader of the Zaydis in battle. He also suppressed an uprising by Sharif Abd Allah ibn Abd Allah al-Husayni, defeating him in open battle. Contemporary chroniclers described al-Mu'izz as reckless and prone to grossly erratic behavior. Eight hundred of his own mamluks revolted against him, but he defeated and expelled them from the region. He subsequently marched on Sanaa, where he arrested Humam al-Din Abu Zaba and had him executed in Muharram 594 AH, then returned south. In Zabid he founded a madrasa and ordered that all official correspondence be issued in his name.

That same year, the Imam al-Mansur publicly declared a rival claim and was joined by a faction of al-Mu'izz's own troops under the commander Chakk, who gathered some two hundred horsemen. When al-Mu'izz returned to Sanaa and the two forces faced each other, Chakk's men defected to al-Mu'izz's side, the Imam was killed, and al-Mu'izz entered Sanaa.

== Claim to the Caliphate ==
After these successes, al-Mu'izz became afflicted with delusions of grandeur. He first claimed divinity, ordering that all official letters bear the heading «This letter issues from the seat of Divinity». Growing wary of the public reaction, he then abandoned this claim and instead asserted fabricated descent from the Umayyad dynasty, formally declaring himself Caliph. He assumed the title «al-Imam al-Hadi bi-Nur Allah al-Mu'izz li-Din Allah Amir al-Mu'minin» ("the Guiding Imam, by the Light of God, the Glorifier of God's Religion, Commander of the Faithful"), donned the ceremonial green robes and insignia of the caliphate, removed the name of the Abbasid caliph from the Friday khutba, and led the sermon himself on khutbas.

His uncles in Egypt wrote to him condemning his actions. When his uncle al-Malik al-Adil learned of the claimed Umayyad lineage in particular, he rejected and denounced it, categorically denying that the Ayyubids had any genealogical connection to the Umayyads whatsoever. A further group of his father's mamluks defected from his service, but al-Mu'izz disregarded their objections and continued to intensify his oppression of his subjects.

Ibn al-Dayba' alone among chroniclers recorded an extraordinary natural event during al-Mu'izz's reign: white ash fell from the sky over Zabid and its surrounding areas for an entire day and night, plunging the world into darkness and causing the populace to fear annihilation. Black ash subsequently appeared, and that year became known as «the Year of the Ash» (Sanat al-Ramad). Earthquakes and tremors were also reported around the year 600 AH.

== Death ==
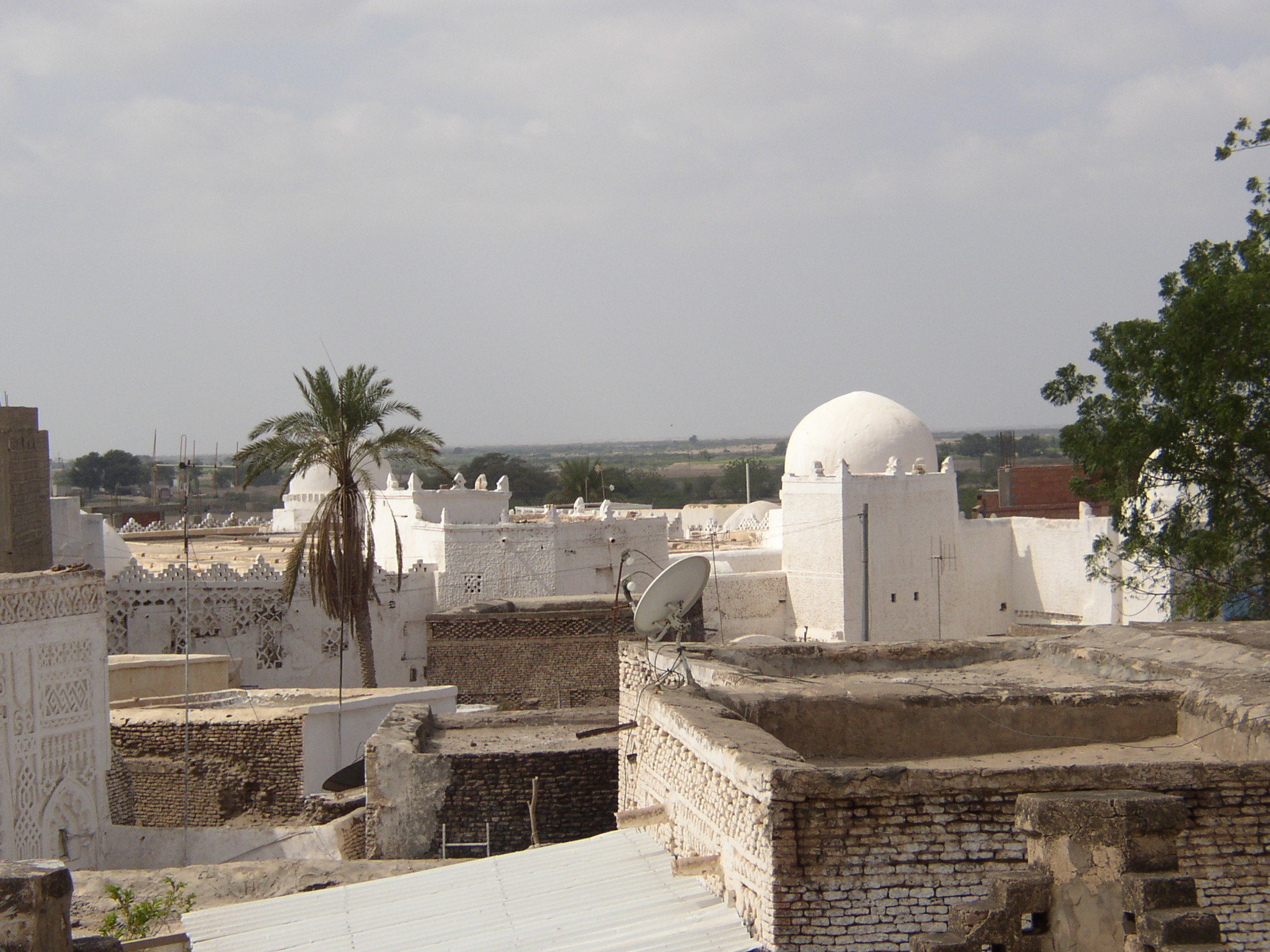
The historic town of Zabid.

When the scandalousness of his caliphal claims could no longer be contained, al-Mu'izz was killed by the Kurds at the gate of Zabid on Sunday, 18 Rajab 598 AH (or 599 AH according to some accounts), after a reign of six years. According to one account, a coalition of Kurdish princes including Shams al-Din ibn al-Daqiq, Bakhl and others, joined forces with his father's mamluks, engaged him in battle in 598 AH, and defeated and killed him. His head was mounted on a spear and paraded through the surrounding towns. His younger brother Ayyub was then installed as ruler of Yemen under the regnal name al-Nasir.

== Aftermath ==
Upon learning of al-Mu'izz's death, the atabeg Sayf al-Din Sunqur who had been in flight and taking refuge in the fortresses of Hajja, descended to Tihamah and rallied the Kurdish commanders and the army. They appointed him atabeg and regent for the young al-Malik al-Nasir Ayyub, after which Sunqur gradually assumed full independent authority over the sultanate. Four years later, Sunqur died and was succeeded as atabeg by Ghazi ibn Jibril, one of the amirs of the state; he was subsequently killed by a group of Arabs, leaving Yemen without a ruling authority.

Ibn Khaldun recorded that the mother of al-Nasir sought the arrival of an Ayyubid prince from outside Yemen whom she could marry in order to consolidate her son's hold on power. The affair ultimately ended with the transfer of power to Sa'd al-Din Shahanshah ibn Ayyub. Al-Malik al-Nasir Ayyub, the brother of Ismail, continued to hold the kingship after him until he died by poisoning on the eve of Friday, 12 Muharram 610 AH.
