= Al-Muzaffar II Mahmud =

Ayyubid emir of Hama from 1229 to 1244

- Emir of Hama
- Reign: 1229–1244
- Predecessor: al-Nasir Kilij Arslan
- Successor: Al-Mansur Muhammad II
- Born: Unknown
- Died: 1244
- Dynasty: Ayyubid
- Religion: Sunni Islam

Al-Muzaffar II Mahmud was the Ayyubid emir of Hama first in 1219 (616 AH) and then restored in 1229–1244 (626 AH–642 AH). He was the son of al-Mansur Muhammad and the older brother of al-Nasir Kilij Arslan.

== Usurpation ==
In 1219, al-Mansur called together the leading men of Hama and made them swear allegiance to his eldest son, al-Muzaffar Mahmud, as his heir apparent, before sending al-Muzaffar to Egypt to aid Sultan al-Kamil. Some time later he sent his second son, an-Nasir Kilij Arslan to join Al-Muazzam in his campaigns in Palestine. However, as he lay dying some of the leading emirs decided to invite an-Nasir back to Hama to usurp the throne in place of his brother, in the hope that they would be able to exercise real control under his nominal rule. Al-Mansur died in January 1221 (Dhu'l Qa'da 617), and An-Nasir duly installed himself as ruler in Hama. In Egypt, when al-Muzaffar learned of his father's death, he obtained Sultan al-Kamil's permission to go and claim his throne. On reaching Syria however he found his brother firmly established on the throne. None of the notables of Hama would support him in removing An-Nasir, and none of the other Ayyubid princes in Syria was interested in helping him, so he had to return to Egypt, where he was given an estate by Al-Kamil.

== Restoration ==
Al-Muzaffar was eventually restored to Hama as a result of the changing balance of power between the major rulers of the Ayyubid family. In November 1228 (Dhu’l Hijja 625) negotiations took place at Tell el-'Ajul near Gaza between Aa-Kamil and his rival al-Ashraf as they sought to agree a balance of power between them across the Ayyubid realms. The result was a comprehensive agreement on redistribution of domains. Al-Kamil's client al-Muzaffar was to be restored to Hama, together with Baarin and Maarrat al-Nu'man. Salamiyah was to be detached from the Hama domain and given to al-Mujahid of Homs.

Al-Ashraf and al-Kamil now worked in tandem to put this plan into effect, and Al Kamil led his armies to Damascus in support of al Ashraf who was laying siege to it. The city surrendered in June and almost at once, al-Kamil turned his attention to Hama. On 25 July 1229 (2 Ramadan 626), Al Kamil, in alliance with al-Mujahid of Homs, laid siege to Hama to remove Kilij Arslan and restore al-Muzaffar. After a few days of siege, Kilij Arslan came out to negotiate, and eventually agreed to leave Hama in return for receiving the fortress of Montferrand near Baarin. Eventually, Kilij Arslan died on the same year.

== Reign ==
Al Muzaffar took part in the major campaign of 1232 (629) led by Al-Kamil which took Amida and Hasankeyf. He also took part in the unsuccessful campaign of 1234 (631) which apparently aimed at Malatya. In 1238–9, he decided to raze the Montferrand castle to the ground.

== Conflict with Homs ==
Al-Muzaffar owed his throne to the ruler of Homs, al-Mujahid, who had organised the conference of the Ayyubid rulers at Tell el-'Ajul in 1228–29 which agreed his restoration. However one of the terms of this agreement was that Hama was to turn over the fief of Salamiyah. This was to be the source of constant hostility between the two rulers thereafter. On taking control of the town however Al-Mujahid built a great fortress nearby, which al-Muzaffar interpreted as a threat to him. This led to bad relations between the emirs, and when al-Muzaffar joined al-Kamil of Egypt in a campaign to oust al-Mujahid, the tensions between them broke out into open conflict. When al-Kamil died al-Mujahid attacked the territory of Hama, devastating the countryside and diverting both the River Orontes and the canals which irrigated the fields around the city. He was not able to take the city however, but constant tension and aggression prevailed between the two rulers for the remainder of their days.

In the diplomatic manoeuvres which followed the death of al-Kamil, the emir of Hama, Al-Muzaffar, allied himself with As-Salih Ayyub and persuaded him that he could usefully secure his position in Syria before attacking Egypt by removing Al-Mujahid from Homs. al-Mujahid was allied with as-Salih' Ayyub's rival as-Salih Ismail. In March 1239 (Sha’ban 636), As-Salih Ayyub set out with his forces to attack Homs, but soon after he received envoys from Egypt complaining of the rule of al-Adil II and urging him to come and take power himself. In April 1239 therefore as-Salih Ayyub turned away from Homs and moved his forces south in preparation for an invasion of Egypt. As the threat receded, Al-Mujahid conspired with As-Salih Ayyub's uncle, As-Salih Ismail, to take Damascus and divide the Syrian domains between them.

Al-Mujahid also undertook some covert warfare against Hama in a rather unusual way. Theobald of Champagne was leading a new crusade and arrived in Palestine in September 1239 (Safar 637). Al-Muzaffar lured Theobald's group with empty promises of converting to Christianity and turning over fortresses to the crusaders. He then managed to start a rumour in the city that al-Muzaffar was about to hand it over to the Crusaders to prevent it from being taken by him. Believing themselves to be in danger, a number of the civic and military leaders of Hama fled to Homs, where they were immediately imprisoned by al-Mujahid. The effect of this incident was to disable Hama temporarily and prevent al-Muzaffar from doing anything to stop Al-Mujahid from moving on Damascus.

As a result, al-Mujahid and as-Salih Ismail were able to take Damascus on 28 September 1239 (27 Safar 637). However shortly afterwards al-Mujahid died. As-Salih Ayyub steadily extended is control over all the Ayyubid domains, and al-Muzaffar continued to rule in Hama until his death in 1244.

== Family ==
Al-Muzaffar was married to a woman called Ghaziya Khatun, who was the mother of his successor Al Mansur II.

== Bibliography ==
- Humphreys, R.S. (1977), Saladin to the Mongols: The Ayyubids of Damascus 1193-1260, SUNY Press
- Painter, Sidney (1969). "The Crusade of Theobald of Champagne and Richard of Cornwall, 1239–1241". In Robert Lee Wolff; Harry W. Hazard (eds.). A History of the Crusades, Volume II: The Later Crusades, 1189–1311. Madison: University of Wisconsin Press. pp. 463–86.
- Runciman, S.; Hunyadi, Z.; Laszlovszky, J. (2001), The Crusades and the Military Orders: Expanding the Frontier of Medieval Latin Christianity, CEU Medievalia
