= Al-Mansur I Muhammad =

Ayyubid emir of Hama from 1191 to 1221

- Emir of Hama
- Reign: 1191–1221
- Predecessor: Al-Muzaffar Umar
- Successor: Nasir Kilij-Arslan
- Born: 1171
- Died: 1221 (aged 49–50)
- Dynasty: Ayyubid
- Religion: Sunni Islam

Al-Mansur I Muhammad was the Ayyubid emir of Hama, son of Al Muzaffar Taqi ad-Din Umar and grandson of Nur ad-Din Shahanshah, brother of Saladin and Al-Adil. He ruled from 1191 to 1219.

== Accession ==
On the death of his father Taqi ad-Din Umar at the siege of Manzikert in 1191, Al-Mansur requested that Saladin invest him with all of his father’s territories. However the tone of his request was such that it greatly angered Saladin, who threatened to dispossess himself altogether. Al-Mansur asked Saladin’s brother Al-Adil to intercede for him, but Saladin decided to detach the Jazira from Taqi ad-Din Umar’s domain and give it to his own son, Al-Afdal. He did however confirm all-Mansur in possession of Hama and the surrounding districts, together with scattered towns across Syria - Salamiyah, Maarrat al-Nu'man, Qal'at Najm and Manbij.

== Wars of Succession ==
As newly installed ruler of Hama, Al-Mansur was expected to maintain a supporting role to the larger Ayyubid domain of Aleppo, ruled by another son of Saladin, az-Zahir Ghazi. Within a few months of his accession, Saladin died and a power struggle began between his sons Al-Afdal and al-Aziz Uthman. Together with Az-Zahir Ghazi, Al-Mansur joined the coalition of Syrian Ayyubid emirs supporting Al-Afdal.

In the succession struggles which followed, Al-Mansur agreed to send troops to support Az-Zahir in return for being allowed to besiege the fortress of Baarin, which belonged to another of Az-Zahir’s vassals. Al-Mansur took the fortress in September 1199, but later compensated its lord, Izz ad-Din ibn al-Muqaddam, by giving him Manbij and Qalat Najm in exchange. Al-Mansur later decided that his interests were best served not by continuing to support Az Zahir and Al Afdal, but by backing Al-Adil. This prompted Az-Zahir to attack Ma’arrat al-Nu’man, which he took, and then to attack Hama itself. The siege began in May 1201, and after a month Al-Mansur was able to negotiate a peace only by promising to pay Az-Zahir 30,000 dinars and swear obedience to him when and if he succeeded in conquering Damascus.

However, in October 1201 (Muharram 598) Al Afdal decided to give up his struggle for supremacy. He called his followers together and told them to either follow his brother Az-Zahir or his uncle Al-Adil. He then formally submitted to Al Adil and departed to his possessions in the East. Fortunately for the former allies, such as Al Mansur, whom Al Afdal had left behind, Al Adil also wanted a general reconciliation and Al-Mansur was left in charge of Hama.

== Military Campaigns ==
In May 1203 (Ramadan 599) Al-Mansur secured the assistance of Al-Mujahid of Homs and Bahramshah of Baalbek in an attack on the Crusader County of Tripoli and on the Hospitaller fortress of Krak des Chevaliers from which raids were frequently mounted on Hama territories. On 16 May 1203 (3 Ramadan 599) a battle was fought between the combined Ayyubid forces and the Crusaders. Al-Mansur was victorious and sent many knights back to Hama as prisoners. Less than three weeks later, on 3 June (21 Ramadan) a Hospitaller force attempted to attack Barin, but Al-Mansur defeated them as well, killing a great number.

However, in 1204 or 1205 (601) a Crusader raid inflicted a sharp defeat on Al Mansur and many of the people of Hama were killed or captured by Crusaders. Al Mansur sought help from Al-Mu’azzam in Damascus, but when these reinforcements arrived no further operations occurred, and Al-Mansur was able to negotiate a truce with the Hospitallers.

In 1209-10 Al-Mansur joined Al-Adil in a large campaign to drive back the forces of Queen Tamar of Georgia which were threatening Muslim emirates in eastern Anatolia. The Ayyubid army was so large that the Georgians withdrew from Akhlat, which they had been threatening. Al-Adil therefore turned his army on the Zengid cities of Al-Khabur, which he took, and Nusaybin, which he trusted Al Mansur and Al-Ashraf to take, while he tried, unsuccessfully, to take Sinjar. Al-Adil took Nusaybn for himself however, so Al Mansur gained nothing from the campaign.

At some time between April 1214 and May 1215 (611) the Hospitallers began massing a large army once again at Krak des Chevaliers, threatening both Homs and Hama. Al-Mansur was however able to forestall any campaigning by writing to Az-Zahir Ghazi in Aleppo, who warned the Crusaders not to attack his allies. The Crusaders accepted a tribute and the expected attack never materialised.

== Death ==
In 1219 (616) Al-Mansur called together the leading men of Hama and made them swear allegiance to his eldest son, Al-Muzaffar II Mahmud, as his heir apparent, before sending Al-Muzaffar to Egypt to aid Sultan Al-Kamil. Some time later he sent his second son, An-Nasir Kilich Arslan to join Al-Muazzam in his campaigns in Palestine. However, as he lay dying some of the leading emirs decided to invite An-Nasr back to Hama to usurp the throne in place of his brother, in the hope that they would be able to exercise real control under his nominal rule. Al-Mansur died, and An-Nasir duly installed himself as ruler in Hama.

In Egypt, when Al-Muzaffar learned of his father’s death, he obtained Sultan Al-Kamil’s permission to go and claim his throne. On reaching Syria however he found his brother firmly established on the throne. None of the notables of Hama would support him in removing An-Nasir, and none of the other Ayyubid princes in Syria was interested in helping him, so he had to return to Egypt, where he was given an estate by Al-Kamil.
