= Al-Muzaffar Umar =

Ayyubid emir of Hama from 1179 to 1191

- Emir of Hama (1179–1191); Viceroy of Egypt (1181–1185)
- Reign: 1179–1191
- Coronation: 1179
- Predecessor: Salah ad-Din
- Successor: Al-Mansur I Muhammad
- Born: Syria
- Died: 1191; Khilat, Mesopotamia
- Burial: Hama, Syria
- Al-Muzaffar Taqi al-Din Umar
- Dynasty: Ayyubid
- Father: Nur ad-Din Shahanshah
- Religion: Sunni Islam

Al-Muzaffar Taqi al-Din Umar (Arabic: المظفر تقي الدين عمر) (died 1191) was the Ayyubid prince of Hama from 1179 to 1191 and a general of Saladin. He was the son of Saladin's brother Nur ad-Din Shahanshah, and brother of Farrukh Shah of Baalbek.

== Emir of Hama ==
After the conquest of Syria and northern Iraq, Saladin named al-Muzaffar Umar the sovereign of Ayyubid-ruled Mesopotamia. In the city of Edessa located in the Mesopotamian territory, al-Muzaffar Umar also built a madrasa. He particularly showed favor for those who worked in religious law and the Sufis. He was handed the principality of Hama four years after helping Saladin conquer it in 1175. His ascendancy ushered in an era of prosperity for Hama that lasted until the end of Ayyubid rule in 1341. During al-Muzaffar Umar's reign, the city was walled, and palaces, markets, madrasas, and mosques were built.

== Viceroy of Egypt ==
In 1181, while in Manbij, he attempted to block the Zengid forces of Izz ud-Din Mas'ud from reaching Aleppo, but failed and was forced to retreat to Hama. Two years later, Saladin's brother and his deputy ruler in Egypt, al-Adil, was sent to besiege Kerak in southern Transjordan which was in Crusader hands. Saladin therefore sent al-Muzaffar Umar as al-Adil's replacement.

While in Egypt, he was granted the province of Fayyum as a fief. He founded two Sunni Muslim madrasas (Islamic education institutions) in the province, one for the Shafi'i denomination and the other for the Maliki denomination. In Cairo, he erected a madrasa bearing the name Manazil al-Izz which was a former residence of his—originally taken from the Fatimids. All of his Egyptian properties were made a part of his waqf ("religious endowment"). However, in 1185, Saladin appointed his son, al-Aziz Uthman, to rule Egypt on his behalf.

== Return to Syria ==
This act upset al-Muzaffar Umar who resolved to invade the Maghreb, but was discouraged from doing so by his aides. He acceded to Saladin's request that he return to serve as an army commander under his authority. The two met near Damascus and al-Muzaffar Umar was graciously welcomed by his uncle. Later, in 1187, al-Muzaffar Umar participated in the Battle of Hattin, where he proved instrumental in the decisive Ayyubid victory over the Crusader armies.

Afterward, he returned to Hama, and soon after he led his forces to Arbil in Mesopotamia with the intention of capturing the Seljuk-held castle of Manzikert. The siege continued for weeks and al-Muzaffar Umar died while it was in effect on October 19, 1191. His body was transported to Hama where it was buried. His son Al-Mansur Muhammad was appointed his successor and al-Muzaffar Umar's descendants would end up ruling Hama until being deposed by the Mamluk Sultanate in 1341.

Baha ad-Din ibn Shaddad witnessed how Saladin and his commanders Alamuddin Sulaiman Ibn Jander, Sabiquddin Othman bin Daya and Izzuddin Ibrahim bin Muqaddam broke into tears when they received a letter confirming the death of Al-Muzaffar Umar, he died on Friday 19th of Ramadan.

== Legacy ==
Al-Muzaffar Umar's sons Zain ad-Din and Al-Malik Al-Mansur continued to serve Saladin with the utmost loyalty.

In fact Zain ad-Din is known to have punished the renegade Ibn Kafjak for massacring the population of Urumiah in his attempts to foment an internal struggle among the Muslim ranks instead of placing him in the dungeons of Al-Kerkhani. Al-Malik Al-Mansur succeeded his father as Emir of Hama.

== Bibliography ==
- Abu-Lughod, Janet L.; Dumper, Michael (2007), Cities of the Middle East and North Africa: A Historical Encyclopedia, ABC-CLIO, ISBN 978-1-57607-919-5
- Lane-Poole, Stanley (2004), The Mohammedan Dynasties: Chronological and Genealogical Tables with Historical Introductions, Kessinger Publishing, ISBN 9781417945702
- Ibn Khallikān; Slane, William MacGuckin (1843), Ibn Khallikan's Biographical Dictionary, Oriental Translation Fund of Great Britain and Ireland, ISBN 9781417945702
