= Farrukh Shah =

Ayyubid emir of Baalbek from 1179 to 1182

- Al-Malik al-Mansur

Emir of Baalbek
- Reign: 1179–1182
- Predecessor: Turanshah
- Successor: Bahramshah
Names
- Al-Malik al-Mansur Izz ad-Din Abu Sa'id Farrukhshah Dawud
- Dynasty: Ayyubid
- Father: Shahanshah ibn Ayyub
- Religion: Sunni Islam

Al-Malik al-Mansur Izz ad-Din Abu Sa'id Farrukhshah Dawud was the Kurdish Ayyubid Emir of Baalbek between 1179 and 1182 and Na'ib (Viceroy) of Damascus.

== Biography ==
Farrukh Shah was the son of Saladin's brother Nur ad-Din Shahanshah and the older brother of Taqi ad-Din Umar who became Emir of Hama.

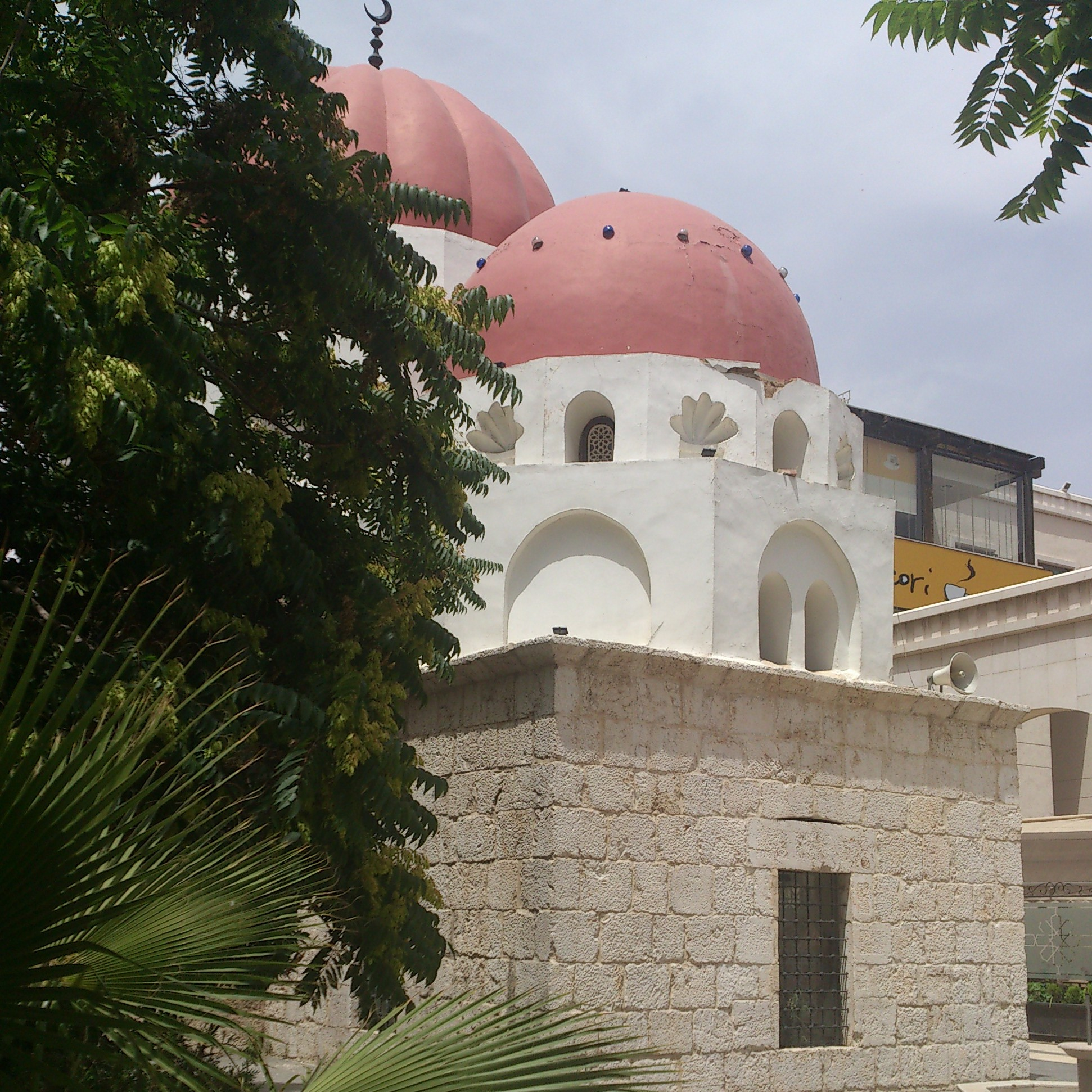
Farrukh Shah Mosque in Damascus

In 1178, Saladin decided that the administration of his brother Shams ad-Din Turan-Shah in Damascus was too lax, and its relations with the Zengid rulers of Aleppo rather too friendly. He therefore moved Turan-Shah and selected his nephew Farrukh Shah as his successor. Farrukhshah had already proved himself to be a good soldier and he appears to have met Saladin’s expectations as an administrator, as he remained viceroy of Damascus until his death in October 1182 (Jumada 1 578).

Turan-Shah was compensated for his loss of Damascus with the domain of Baalbek, but he did not hold it for long. In May 1179 (Dhu’l Qa’da 574), Saladin moved him again and made him governor of Alexandria. For a second time, Farrukhshah was the beneficiary of Turan-Shah’s removal and Saladin gave him Baalbek. Much of his reign was occupied in supporting Saladin’s wars against the Crusaders. Shortly after his appointment to Baalbek, Farrukh Shah won a victory near the fortress of Belfort against Baldwin IV of Jerusalem, killing Humphrey II of Toron.

Farrukh Shah died in September 1182 (Jumada I 578) leaving a young boy, al-Amjad Bahramshah, as his successor.
