= Bahramshah =

Ayyubid emir of Baalbek from 1182 to 1230

- Al-Malik al-Amjad

Emir of Baalbek
- Reign: 1182–1230
- Predecessor: Farrukh Shah
- Dynasty: Ayyubid
- Father: Farrukh Shah
- Religion: Sunni Islam

Al-Malik al-Amjad Bahramshah was the Kurdish Ayyubid emir of Baalbek between 1182–1230 (578–627 AH).

== Reign ==
Bahramshah succeeded his father Farrukhshah as ruler of the minor emirate of Baalbek and had an unusually long reign for an Ayyubid ruler. Baalbek was a marcher domain at the time of the Crusades and Bahramshah's main role was to provide a speedy military response to any threats from the County of Tripoli. as well as supporting larger campaigns against the Zengids of Aleppo.

In the complex political and military world of the Ayyubids, relationships between extended family members and between individual emirates and other, smaller estates were of critical importance. The cornerstone of Bahramshah's long rule was the close alliance with his larger and more powerful neighbor, Damascus. At some time in 1228 (625 AH) one of Bahramshah's sons conspired with al-Aziz Uthman of Banyas, son of al-Adil I and some members of the Baalbek garrison to remove Bahramshah and replace him with al-Aziz Uthman. The plan was not executed well, and Bahramshah was able to call on an-Nasir Dawud in Damascus for support. An-Nasir demanded that al-Aziz withdraw and Bahramshah remained in control of the city.

== Death and aftermath ==
The end of Bahramshah's reign came in 1230 as a result of the struggles between Sultan al-Kamil of Egypt and an-Nasir Dawud of Damascus. Al-Aziz Uthman was backing al-Kamil in this war in the hope of rewards, and by an agreement reached at Tell al-Ajjul between al-Kamil and al-Ashraf, he was to receive Baalbek once an-Nasir had been defeated. Once an-Nasir surrendered, the Egyptian army entered Damascus and al-Kamil gave it to his brother al-Ashraf. Baalbek, having supported an-Nasir, was on the losing side, but once installed in Damascus al-Ashraf refused to allow al-Aziz to take it from Bahramshah. Instead, he directed his other brother as-Salih Ismail to lead an expedition and take Baalbek.

Bahramshah however refused to hand over the city he had ruled for nearly half a century. Baalbek sustained a siege lasting ten months before he decided to seek terms, and eventually agreed to leave Baalbek in return for a small private estate near Damascus. On these terms he withdrew leaving al-Ashraf as the new ruler of Baalbek and retiring to his residence in Damascus. Later the same year he was murdered by one of his own mamluks in a dispute about a stolen inkwell, in what appears to have been a revenge attack for some punishment. Bahramshah is said to have been the best poet of the Ayyubids.

After Bahramshah's death neither of his two sons, as-Sa’id and al-Muzaffar Taqi ad-Din, inherited his emirate, which ceased thereafter to be the domain of the descendants of Saladin's brother Nur ad-Din Shahanshah. After Bahramshah's removal, Baalbek was held first by al-Ashraf, then by his brother as-Salih Ismail and then by al-Kamil's son as-Salih Ayyub before reverting from the descendants of al-Adil to a descendant of Saladin himself, the last Ayyubid ruler of Damascus, an-Nasir Yusuf.
