= Al-Muzaffar III Mahmud =

Ayyubid emir of Hama from 1284 to 1300

- Emir of Hama
- Reign: 1284–1300
- Predecessor: Al-Mansur Muhammad II
- Successor: Abu'l-Fida
- Born: Unknown
- Died: 1300
- Dynasty: Ayyubid
- Religion: Sunni Islam

Al-Muzaffar III Mahmud was the Kurdish Ayyubid emir of Hama from 1284 to 1300. He was the son of Al-Mansur Muhammad II whom he succeeded. Hama was at this time was ruled by a line of Kurdish Muslim princes from the Ayyubid dynasty and was also a tributary emirate of the Mamluk Sultanate.

== Biography ==
Al-Muzaffar took part in the siege of Acre in 1291, bringing a large mangonel from Krak des Chevaliers to support the assault on the city. Although a few small Crusader enclaves survived, the fall of Acre marked the end of the Crusader period in Syria and thereafter Mamluk rule was unchallenged.

Unlike Saladin at Jerusalem in 1187, Al-Muzaffar did not keep his word to protect his captives at Acre in 1291. According to al-Maqrizi, Al-Muzaffar "had sworn to the people of the citadel with strong oaths and on the Qur’an and divorcing (his wives). When they came down from the citadel he betrayed them, beheaded its governor and massacred the rest."

According to al-Maqrizi:

The emir was violent, powerful, awe-inspiring and liable to attack suddenly… When he rode, the troops use to walk behind him as if they were between two threads, out of fear they would trample over crops, and nobody out of fear dared to trample on a single stem (of them) nor march his horse on them… If anyone transgressed, he was crucified. He (Al-Muzaffar) used to say: "It does not happen that there is more than one tyrant (meaning himself) at one time."

When he died in 1300 Hama was briefly under direct Mamluk rule, but in 1310 Al-Muzaffar’s cousin Abu'l-Fida was made emir, and there was a final period of Ayyubid tributary rule in the city.
