= Najm al-Din Ayyub =

Kurdish mercenary and politician, father of Saladin

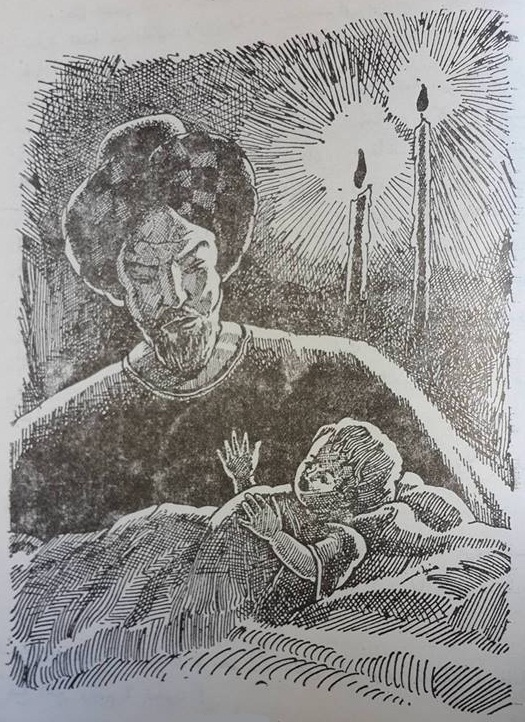
Sketch of Ayyub and infant Saladin.

Al-Malik al-Afdal Najm al-Dīn Ayyūb ibn Shādhi ibn Marwān (Arabic: الملك ألأفضل نجم الدين أيوب بن شاذي بن مروان, Kurdish: نەجمەدین ئەییووبی شادی مەروان, romanized: Necmeddîn Eyûbî Şadî Merwan; died August 9, 1173), or simply Najmadin, was a Kurdish mercenary and politician from Dvin, and the father of Saladin. He is the eponymous ancestor of the Ayyubid dynasty.

== Life and career ==
=== Origins ===
Ayyub was the son of Shadhi ibn Marwan and brother of Shirkuh. The family belonged to the Kurdish Hadhbani tribe of Rawandi also known as Rawadi or Rawadiyya. The Rawadis were the dominant Kurdish group in Dvin, and were a sedentary political-military elite of the region. They originated from Ajdanakan village, near ancient Armenian city of Dvin.

The family were closely connected to the Kurdish Shaddadid dynasty, and when the last Shaddadid was deposed in Dvin in 1130, Shadhi moved the family first to Baghdad and then to Tikrit, where he was appointed governor by the regional administrator Bihruz. Ayyub succeeded his father as governor of Tikrit when Shadhi died soon after.

=== In Zengid service ===
In 1132 Ayyub was in the service of Imad al-Din Zengi. He participated in a battle against the Seljuk Sultan near Tikrit and saved Zengi's life when he assisted his retreat across the Tigris. In 1136, Shirkuh killed a Christian with whom he was quarrelling with in Tikrit, and the brothers were exiled (Ayyub's son Yusuf, later known as Salahadin, was supposedly born the night they left). Zengi later appointed Ayyub governor of Baalbek, and when the town was besieged in 1146 by Mu'in al-Din Unur, the atabeg of the Burid emir of Damascus, Ayyub surrendered Baalbek and retired to Damascus. Shirkuh, meanwhile, entered the service of Zengi's son Nur al-Din Zengi, who had designs on Damascus; when the Second Crusade besieged the city in 1148, Nur al-Din forced Mu'in al-Din and the Burids into a reluctant alliance. Soon Nur al-Din demanded the city be handed over to him, and Ayyub and Shirkuh negotiated its surrender in 1154. Ayyub remained governor of Damascus under Nur al-Din's rule. He was held in such honour that he was the only one of Nur al-Din's officials allowed to remain seated in his presence.

Ayyub's son Saladin also took up service with Nur al-Din, and he was sent to Egypt to take control in Nur al-Din's name during the period of joint crusader-Byzantine invasions.

=== Egypt expedition ===
In 1170 Ayyub joined his son Saladin, in the Egyptian expedition. either summoned by Saladin himself, or sent by Nur al-Din to convince Saladin to depose the last Fatimid caliph. Saladin offered the vizierate to him, but he refused, and instead was granted Alexandria, Damietta, and al-Buhayrah as personal fiefs. The Fiefdom Najm ad-Din Ayyub held, was the most important commercial harbors in lower Egypt. Many of Saladin's other relatives also joined him in Egypt. Nur al-Din did not trust Saladin and his family, correctly assuming that they were consolidating power; Ayyub publicly supported Nur al-Din, but privately warned his son that Nur al-Din should never be allowed to take Egypt from him. Although Ayyub was loyal to Nur al-Din and his trusted counsellor, this loyalty did not necessarily translate to his successors, and it is likely that in the competition between Nur al-Din's lieutenants he saw his family as best-placed with Cairo in their control.

== Death ==
Najm al-Din Ayyub was injured in a horse riding accident on July 31, 1173, and died on August 9. His death exacerbated the tension between Saladin and Nur al-Din; the latter had summoned the former to assist in an expedition against the Kingdom of Jerusalem, but Saladin returned home when he heard of his father's death. However the expected confrontation between Nur al-Din and Saladin did not occur, as Nur al-Din died the next year, and Saladin eventually took control of the whole of Egypt and Syria.

According to Baha al-Din ibn Shaddad, Ayyub was "a noble, generous man, mild and of excellent character." He was also "passionately fond of polo". Ibn al-Qalanisi calls him "a man of resolution, intelligence and knowledge of affairs", who prudently handed over Baalbek to a superior force in return for rewards and honours.

His given name was Ayyub (Job), from which comes the Ayyubid dynasty of Saladin and his successors. Najm al-Din is an honorific meaning "star of the faith".

== Family and children ==
Family members:

•Shadhi ibn Marwan (father)

•Shirkuh (brother, died 1169)

•Sit Khatun (wife)

Ayyub had several children:

- Nur al-Din Shahanshah (died 1148)
- al-Malik al-Mu'azzam Shams al-Dawla Turan-Shah (died 1181)
- Salah al-Din Yusuf (Saladin) (1137–1193)
- al-Malik al-Adil Sayf al-Din Abu Bakr Ahmad (Saphadin) (1145–1218)
- Taj al-Muluk Abu Sa'id Buri (died 1184)
- al-Malik al-'Aziz Sayf al-Islam Tughtekin (died 1197)
- Rabi'a Khatun (daughter, d. 1246), married (1) Amir Sa'd al-Din Mas'ud b. Mu'in al-Din Onor son of Mu'in ad-Din Unur.
- Sitt Ash-Sham Fatima Khatun (daughter)

== Sources ==
- Humphreys, R. S. (1987). "Ayyubids". Encyclopaedia Iranica, Vol. III, Fasc. 2. pp. 164–167.
- Humphreys, Stephen (1977), From Saladin to the Mongols: The Ayyubids of Damascus, 1193–1260, SUNY Press, ISBN 978-0-87395-263-7
- James, Boris (2006). Saladin et les Kurdes: Perception d'un Groupe au Temps des Croisades (in French). Paris: Editions L'Harmattan. ISBN 978-2296001053.
- Baha al-Din ibn Shaddad, The Rare and Excellent History of Saladin, ed. D. S. Richards, Ashgate, 2002.
- The Damascus Chronicle of the Crusades, Extracted and Translated from the Chronicle of Ibn al-Qalanisi. H.A.R. Gibb, 1932 (reprint, Dover Publications, 2002)
- Vladimir Minorsky, "The Prehistory of Saladin", in Studies in Caucasian History, Cambridge University Press, 1957, pp. 124–132. (available online)
- Lyons, Malcolm Cameron; Jackson, D. E. P. (1982). Saladin: The Politics of the Holy War. Cambridge: Cambridge University Press. ISBN 0-521-31739-8.
- P. M. Holt, The Age of the Crusades: The Near East from the Eleventh Century to 1517, Longman, 1986.
