= Al-Ashraf Musa, Emir of Homs =

Ayyubid statesman (1229–1263)

Al-Ashraf Musa الأشرف موسى
- Emir of Homs (1246–48, 1260–63); Emir of Tall-Bashir (1248–1260); Viceroy of Syria (1260)
- Reign: 1246–1263
- Coronation: 1246
- Predecessor: Al-Mansur Ibrahim
- Successor: Alam al-Din Sanjar al-Bashqirdi
- Born: 1229; Syria
- Died: 1263 (aged 33–34); Homs, Syria
- Burial: Homs
- Spouse: Amat al-Latif
Names
- Al-Ashraf Musa ibn al-Mansur Ibrahim
- Dynasty: Ayyubid
- Father: Al-Mansur Ibrahim
- Religion: Sunni Islam

Al-Ashraf Musa (1229–1263), fully Al-Ashraf Musa ibn al-Mansur Ibrahim ibn Shirkuh (Arabic: الأشرف موسى بن المنصور ابراهيم بن شيركوه), was the last Ayyubid Kurdish prince (emir) of Homs, a city located in the central region of modern-day Syria. His rule began in June 1246, but was temporarily cut short in 1248 after he was forced to surrender Homs and then given Tall Bashir by his cousin an-Nasir Yusuf, the Emir of Aleppo. For a short period of time during Mongol rule in 1260, al-Ashraf served as Viceroy of Syria, although the position was largely nominal. He helped achieve the Mongols' defeat at the hands of the Egypt-based Mamluks by withdrawing his troops from the Mongol coalition during the Battle of Ain Jalut as part of a secret agreement with the Mamluk sultan Qutuz. Following the Mamluk victory, al-Ashraf was reinstated as Emir of Homs as a Mamluk vassal, but was stripped of his viceroy position. Since he left no heirs, after his death, Homs was incorporated into the Mamluk Sultanate.

== Ayyubid emir of Homs ==
At age 17, al-Ashraf inherited the principality of Homs after the death of his father, al-Mansur Ibrahim, in 1246. Homs was one of the smaller kingdoms within the confederate Ayyubid empire and was usually dominated by its larger neighbors, but it gained influence during the reign of al-Mansur Ibrahim. Following his death, the role of Homs within the empire largely diminished. From this position of weakness, al-Ashraf arrived at as-Salih Ayyub's court in Damascus during the spring of 1247 in order to gain his patronage. As-Salih, the sultan of Egypt and Damascus, was the strongest Ayyubid emir ("prince") at the time and least inclined to central rule, which mean that al-Ashraf could rule Homs with relative autonomy. To cement this patron-client relationship, al-Ashraf ceded control of Salamiyah, an important stronghold located north of Homs, to as-Salih.

Fearing this alliance would undermine his position, an-Nasir Yusuf, the Ayyubid emir of Aleppo and al-Ashraf's fourth cousin, reacted by attempting to annex Homs. As a result, al-Ashraf sent urgent pleas to as-Salih to aid him against an-Nasir. As-Salih agreed and personally led his troops from Egypt into Syria, but he fell ill and the planned assault against an-Nasir's forces were delayed. By mid-August 1248, al-Ashraf was forced to surrender Homs. Based on the terms of his surrender, he was allowed to maintain control of the desert fortress of Palmyra and al-Rahba, a fortified site situated along the northern banks of the Euphrates River. In place of Homs, he was granted the outpost of Tall Bashir to govern from, even though it was isolated from his remaining territories.

== Viceroy of Syria ==
While governing Tall Bashir, al-Ashraf secretly established ties with the Mongols who were rapidly gaining strength in the region. He encouraged the Mongol invasion of Syria, so that he could be reinstated. In 1260 the Mongols, led by Hulagu Khan, sacked Aleppo, forcing an-Nasir into exile. Al-Ashraf, who was in Damascus at the time of Aleppo's capture, traveled north to an area near the city to confer with Hulagu before he withdrew the bulk of his forces from Syria. With the arrival in Damascus of Kitbuqa, the Nestorian Christian general who oversaw affairs in Syria on behalf of the Mongols, al-Ashraf returned to the city. Upon meeting Kitbuqa, al-Ashraf was made the viceroy of Damascus and all of Syria while being reinstated as the autonomous emir of Homs.

Despite having the official title "sultan" of Syria, al-Ashraf's power was nominal. According to Israeli historian Reuven Amitai, the title was given to him so that the Mongols could have a ruler who carried some form of legitimacy and with whom they could consult. A testament to this situation was that al-Ashraf was ordered to rule from his principality in Homs instead of Damascus, which normally served as Syria's capital. Furthermore, his iqta' (allotment for military service) of 100 horses was the same as that for a battalion commander rather than a general or someone of higher rank. From Homs, he led a Mongol-ordered expedition against Hama, ruled by his cousin al-Malik Mansur, who had fled to Egypt, with the order to disable the defences of that city. Thus, al-Ashraf oversaw the destruction of Hama's citadel wall and arsenal. He also sold off the public library, but refrained from dismantling the city's walls for fear of making Hama susceptible to a Crusader invasion.

== Mamluk vassal and death ==
When the Mamluks, who had succeeded the Ayyubid sultanate in Egypt in 1250, sought to drive out the Mongols from Syria, al-Ashraf made quiet contact with Mamluk sultan Qutuz. Once the Mongol and Mamluk armies faced off during the Battle of Ain Jalut in northern Palestine in September 1260, al-Ashraf withdrew his forces from Kitbuqa's coalition and fled the battle as part of his secret arrangement with Qutuz. Al-Ashraf's action swayed the battle in the Mamluks' favor. Following their decisive victory against the Mongols, the Mamluks proceeded to successfully conquer Syria. Although he was stripped of his nominal position as viceroy of Damascus, al-Ashraf was allowed to continue ruling Homs as a vassal of the Mamluks as a reward for his cooperation.

Baibars became Mamluk sultan in October 1260 and assigned Alam al-Din Sanjar al-Bashqirdi as deputy governor for Homs. Al-Ashraf died in the earlier part of 1263. Since he left no heirs to his throne, Homs was incorporated into the Mamluk Sultanate following his death.

== Family ==
Unlike the majority of the regional Ayyubid emirs, al-Ashraf and his predecessors were descended from Asad al-Din Shirkuh, the brother of Najm ad-Din Ayyub; Ayyub was the patriarch of all the Ayyubid emirs except for those of Homs. In 1249, at age 20, al-Ashraf married Amat al-Latif, the spiritual adviser of Saladin's sister and the daughter of a notable Damascus-based Hanbali scholar. Al-Latif was at least 40 at the time of their marriage. They wed immediately after al-Latif was released from a Damascus jail where she had been imprisoned since 1246. She died in 1253.

== See also ==
- Other Al-Ashraf Musas

== Bibliography ==
- Bai︠a︡rsaĭkhan, D. (2011). The Mongols and the Armenians (1220-1335). Leiden; Boston: Brill. ISBN 978-9-0041-8635-4.
- France, John (2011). Perilous Glory: The Rise of Western Military Power. Yale University Press. p. 145. ISBN 978-0-300-12074-5. "Ashraf Musa Homs."
- Holt, Peter Malcolm (1995). Early Mamluk Diplomacy, 1260-1290: Treaties of Baybars and Qalāwūn With Christian Rulers. BRILL. ISBN 90-04-10246-9.
- Houtsma, M. Thomas (1987). E. J. Brill's first encyclopaedia of Islam 1913-1936. BRILL. ISBN 90-04-08265-4.
- Howorth, Henry (1888). History of the Mongols. University of Virginia.
- Humphreys, R. Stephens (1977). From Saladin to the Mongols: the Ayyubids of Damascus, 1193-1260. SUNY Press. ISBN 9780873952637.
- Necipogulu, Gulru (1994). Muqarnas: An Annual on Islamic Art and Architecture. BRILL. ISBN 90-04-10070-9.
- Shagrir, Iris (2007). In laudem hierosolymitani: Studies In Crusades and Medieval Culture. Ashgate Publishing, Ltd. ISBN 978-0-7546-6140-5.
