= Battle of Ain Jalut =

1260 battle between the Mamluk Sultanate and the Mongol Empire

Coordinates: 32.5506°N 35.3569°E

- Part of Mongol raids into Palestine
- Map showing movements of both forces, meeting eventually at Ain Jalut
Date	3 September 1260 (26 Ramadan 658 H)
Location	Near Ma'ayan Harod (Hebrew) or Ayn Jalut (Arabic), Jezreel Valley, Mamluk Sultanate
Result	Mamluk victory
Territorial changes	The Mongols withdraw from the Levant and cede occupied territories to the Mamluk Sultanate

Belligerents
Mamluk Sultanate	Ilkhanate; Cilician Armenia; Kingdom of Georgia

Commanders and leaders
Qutuz; Baybars	Kitbuqa Noyan (executed); Al-Ashraf Musa, Emir of Homs (surrendered)

Units involved
Light cavalry and horse archers, heavy cavalry, infantry, hand cannoneers	Mongol lancers and horse archers

Strength
15,000–20,000	10,000–20,000 (Note: Cowley, states that both sides were evenly matched at 20,000 men. Cline says that "In short, the ... armies that were to meet at 'Ayn Jalut were probably of approximately the same size, with between ten thousand and twenty thousand men in each." Hrbek, however, state that "the Mongol force at Ayn Jalut was nothing but a detachment, which was vastly outnumbered by the Mamluk army".)

Casualties and losses
Unknown	Heavy

The Battle of Ain Jalut (Arabic: معركة عين جالوت, romanized: Ma'rakat 'Ayn Jālūt), also spelled Ayn Jalut, was fought between the Bahri Mamluks of Egypt and the Ilkhanate on 3 September 1260 near the spring of Ain Jalut in southeastern Galilee in the Jezreel Valley. It marks the first major halt to Mongolian advances and paused their expansion into Arabia and Europe.

Continuing the westward expansion of the Ilkhanate, the armies of Hulegu Khan captured and sacked Baghdad in 1258, along with the Ayyubid capital of Damascus sometime later. Hulegu sent envoys to Cairo demanding Qutuz surrender Egypt, to which Qutuz responded by killing the envoys and displaying their heads on the Bab Zuweila gate of Cairo. Shortly after this, Möngke Khan was slain in battle against the Southern Song. Hulegu returned to Mongolia with the bulk of his army to attend the kurultai in accordance with Mongol customs, leaving approximately 10,000 troops west of the Euphrates under the command of Kitbuqa.

Learning of these developments, Qutuz quickly advanced his army from Cairo towards Palestine. Kitbuqa sacked Sidon, before turning his army south toward Ain Jalut to meet Qutuz' forces. Using hit-and-run tactics and a feigned retreat by Mamluk general Baibars, combined with a final flanking maneuver by Qutuz, the Mamluks forced the Mongol army to retreat toward Bisan, after which the Mamluks led a final counterattack, which resulted in the deaths of many Mongols, including Kitbuqa himself.

The battle has been cited as the first time the Mongols were permanently prevented from expanding their influence; it also marked the first of two defeats the Mongols would face in their attempts to invade Egypt and the Levant, the other being the Battle of Marj al-Saffar in 1303.

== Background ==
When Möngke Khan became Great Khan in 1251, he immediately set out to implement his grandfather Genghis Khan's plan for a world empire. To lead the task of subduing the nations in the West, he selected his brother, another of Genghis Khan's grandsons, Hulegu Khan. Assembling the army took five years, and it was not until 1256 that Hulegu was prepared to begin the invasions. Operating from the Mongol base in Persia, Hulegu proceeded south. Möngke had ordered good treatment for those who yielded without resistance and destruction for the rest. In that way, Hulegu and his army had conquered some of the most powerful and longstanding dynasties of the time.

Other countries in the Mongols' path submitted to Mongol authority and contributed forces to the Mongol army. When the Mongols had reached Baghdad, their army included Cilician Armenians and even some Frankish forces from the Principality of Antioch. The Assassins in Persia fell, the 500-year-old Abbasid Caliphate of Baghdad was destroyed (see Battle of Baghdad) and the Ayyubid dynasty in Damascus fell as well. Hulegu's plan was then to proceed southwards through the Kingdom of Jerusalem towards the Mamluk Sultanate, to confront the major Islamic power.

During the Mongol attack on the Mamluks in the Middle East, most of the Mamluks were Kipchaks, and the Golden Horde's supply of Kipchaks replenished the Mamluk armies and helped them fight off the Mongols.

== Prelude ==
In 1260, Hulegu sent envoys to Qutuz in Cairo with a letter demanding his surrender. Qutuz responded, however, by killing the envoys and displaying their heads on Bab Zuweila, one of the gates of Cairo. Hulegu withdrew from the Levant with the bulk of his army, leaving his forces west of the Euphrates with only one tumen (nominally 10,000 men, but usually fewer), and a handful of vassal troops under the Naiman Nestorian Christian general Kitbuqa. Contemporary Mamluk chronicler al-Yunini's Dhayl Mirat Al-Zaman states that the Mongol army under Kitbuqa, including vassals, numbered 100,000 men in total, but this was likely an exaggeration. (Note: Until the late 20th century, historians believed that Hulegu's sudden retreat had been caused by the power dynamic having been changed by the death of the Great Khan Möngke on an expedition to the Song dynasty's China, which made Hulegu and other senior Mongols return home to decide his successor. However, contemporary documentation discovered in the 1980s reveals that to be untrue, as Hulegu himself claimed that he withdrew most of his forces because he could not sustain such a large army logistically, that the fodder in the region had been mostly used up and that a Mongol custom was to withdraw to cooler lands for the summer.Paul Meyvaert, "An Unknown Letter of Hulegu, Il-khan of Persia, to King Louis IX of France," Viator 11 (1980): 258; 249: "Since it is our custom to prefer the cooler places of the snowy mountains in the heat of summer, we decided to return for a while to the mountains of Greater Armenia, especially as the greater part of the food and fodder had been consumed after the devastation of Aleppo and Damacsus ... it is nevertheless our intention shortly to complete our plan...")

Upon receiving news of Hulegu's departure, Mamluk Sultan Qutuz quickly assembled a large army at Cairo and departed on July 26, 1260, and traveled to al-Salihiyya. Al-Nasir Yusuf's Syrian battalions and the Egyptian army proper, along with the Shahraziriyya Kurds, Arabs, and Turcomans, made up his forces. However, al-Magrizi claims that the amirs at al-Salihiyya declined to pursue Qutuz's attack on the Mongols. After then, the sultan had to use a powerful speech to overcome their opposition. Baybars was subsequently elevated by Qutuz to head the vanguard in order to scout the enemy's movements. With the soldiers he commanded, Baybars advanced on Gaza, which was then a Mongol outpost.

Upon his approach, Baydara, the Mongol commander, dispatched an urgent report to Kitbugha. However, before Baydara received orders from Kitbugha to hold Gaza and await the main Mongol force, the town had been taken by Baybars, and Qutuz's Egyptian army had already entered Gaza. Deflated, Baydara was forced to retreat. An advance to the north was required if Kitbugha's main Mongol force was to be routed and expelled from Syria following this initial victory. The Palestinian coast was by far the most practical path for a sizable army during the hot season, and it also ensured that the army would have access to water. However, this road went through Jerusalem, which was part of the Frankish realm. In order to secure the right of free passage for his army from the Acre administration, or more likely to gain the support from the Franks, Qutuz dispatched negotiators there.

There were lengthy discussion of how to react. The Franks have long viewed their Muslim neighbors as close trading partners and more or less calculating rivals. The rulers of Acre, in contrast to Bohemond VI, prince of Antioch and count of Tripoli, viewed the Mongols as barbarians and preferred the Muslims. The Franks had not been unimpressed by the Mongols' recent conquest and looting of Sidon. As Egypt's rulers since 1250, the Mamluks, on the other hand, had not yet taken on the appearance of being a threat to the Franks. They eventually remained neutral but allowed Qutuz to march through their territories, and supplied his army with provisions while it was encamped on the plain of Acre. Qutuz led his army from Acre to the interior against the Mongols after securing the Franks' neutrality, which relieved him of the concern that they might stab him in the back. Rashid al-Din claims that Kitbugha was lodging at Ba'labakk when he learned of the Egyptian army's impending arrival. Yunini claims that he initially set his camp in the Biga' plain.

While still in the Biqac valley, Ketbugha heard that the Mamluks had invaded Syria and were moving north. Then he marched south, gathering his dispersed men, probably scattered for grazing and garrison chores. His prudence appears to have sprung from his awareness of Qutuz's strength and his limited men. Ketbugha seems to have had between 10,000 and 12,000 soldiers left. In addition to the Georgian and Lesser Armenian battalions, the army also included contingents of two Ayyubid princes, al-Ashraf Musa and al-Said Hasan, as well as local levies who had previously served the Syrian Ayyubids. Ketbugha chose to make a stand near Ayn Jalut. The evidence strongly indicates the Mongols arrived first and took up their positions: when Baybars reached a nearby height, he found their camp already in place.

=== The battlefield ===
Ayn Jalut is a perennial spring at the northwestern foot of Mount Gilboa, about 15 km north-northwest of Baysan, just west of today's Gidona; the spring is now called 'Ayn or Ma'yan Harod. For the Mongols, it was a sensible defensive choice. Wadi (Nahr) Jalut runs along the northern base of Gilboa, providing ample water for the horses, while the adjacent valley offered pasture and favorable ground for cavalry operations. Additional benefits were clear: the slopes of Gilboa secured a flank and supplied commanding observation points, as did the nearby Hill of Moreh (Givat HaMoreh).

== Battle ==
The first to advance were the Mongols, whose force also included troops from the Kingdom of Georgia and about 500 troops from the Armenian Kingdom of Cilicia, both of which had submitted to Mongol authority. The Mamluks had the advantage of knowing the terrain, and Qutuz capitalized on that by hiding the bulk of his force in the highlands and hoping to bait the Mongols with a smaller force, under Baibars.

Both armies fought for many hours, with Baibars usually implementing hit-and-run tactics to provoke the Mongol troops and to preserve the bulk of his troops intact. When the Mongols carried out another heavy assault, Baibars, who it is said had laid out the overall strategy of the battle since he had spent much time in that region earlier in his life as a fugitive, and his men feigned a final retreat to draw the Mongols into the highlands to be ambushed by the rest of the Mamluk forces concealed among the trees. The Mongol leader, Kitbuqa, already provoked by the constant fleeing of Baibars and his troops, committed a grave mistake. Instead of suspecting a trick, Kitbuqa decided to march forward with all of his troops on the trail of the fleeing Mamluks. When the Mongols reached the highlands, Mamluk forces emerged from hiding and began to fire arrows and attack with their cavalry. The Mongols then found themselves surrounded on all sides. Additionally, Timothy May hypothesizes that a key moment in the battle was the defection of the Mongol Syrian allies.

The Mongol army fought aggressively to break out. Some distance away, Qutuz watched with his private legion. When Qutuz saw the left wing of the Mamluk army almost destroyed by the Mongol attack, he threw away his combat helmet, so that his warriors could recognize him and cried loudly three times "O Islam! O Allah grant your servant Qutuz a victory against these Mongols". He was seen the next moment rushing towards the battlefield yelling wa islamah! ("Oh my Islam"), urging his army to keep firm and advancing towards the weakened side, followed by his own unit. The Mongols were pushed back and fled to a vicinity of Beisan, followed by Qutuz's forces, but they managed to reorganize and to return to the battlefield, making a successful counterattack. However, the battle shifted toward the Mamluks, who now had both the geographic and psychological advantage, and some of the Mongols were eventually forced to retreat. Kitbuqa, with almost the rest of the Mongol army that had remained in the region, perished.

== Aftermath ==
Hulegu Khan ordered the execution of the last Ayyubid emir of Aleppo and Damascus, An-Nasir Yusuf, and his brother, who were in captivity, after he heard the news of the defeat of the Mongol army at Ain Jalut. However, the Mamluks captured Damascus five days later after Ain Jalut, followed by Aleppo within a month.

On the way back to Cairo after the victory at Ain Jalut, Qutuz was assassinated by several emirs in a conspiracy led by Baibars. Baibars became the new Sultan. Local Ayyubid emirs sworn to the Mamluk sultanate subsequently defeated another Mongol force of 6,000 at Homs, which ended the first Mongol expedition into Syria. Baibars and his successors would go on to capture the last of the Crusader states in the Holy Land by 1291.

Internecine conflict prevented Hulegu Khan from being able to bring his full power against the Mamluks to avenge the pivotal defeat at Ain Jalut. Berke Khan, the Khan of the Golden Horde to the north of Ilkhanate, had converted to Islam and watched with horror as his cousin destroyed the Abbasid Caliph, the spiritual and administrative center of Islam. The Muslim historian Rashid-al-Din Hamadani quoted Berke as sending the following message to Mongke Khan, protesting the attack on Baghdad since he did not know that Mongke had died in China: "He (Hulegu) has sacked all the cities of the Muslims, and has brought about the death of the Caliph. With the help of God I will call him to account for so much innocent blood." The Mamluks, learning through spies that Berke was a Muslim and was not fond of his cousin, were careful to nourish their ties to him and his Khanate. Later on, Hulegu was able to send only a small army of two tumens in his sole attempt to attack the Mamluks in Aleppo in December 1260. They were able to massacre a large number of Muslims in retaliation for the death of Kitbuqa, but after a fortnight could make no other progress and had to retreat.

After the Mongol succession was finally settled, with Kublai as the last Great Khan, Hulegu returned to his lands by 1262 and massed his armies to attack the Mamluks and avenge Ain Jalut. However, Berke Khan initiated a series of raids in force that lured Hulegu north, away from the Levant, to meet him. Hulegu suffered a severe defeat in an attempted invasion north of the Caucasus in 1263. That was the first open war among the Mongols and signaled the end of the unified empire. Hulegu Khan died in 1265 and was succeeded by his son Abaqa. The Muslim Mamluks defeated the Mongols in all battles except one. Beside a victory to the Mamluks in Ain Jalut, the Mongols were defeated in the second Battle of Homs, Elbistan and Marj al-Saffar. After five battles with the Mamluks, the Mongols only won at the Battle of Wadi al-Khaznadar. They never returned to Syria again.

== Legacy ==
=== Medieval ===
The large number of sources in vastly-different languages caused Mongol historians to have generally focused on one limited aspect of the empire. From that standpoint, the Battle of Ain Jalut has been represented by numerous academic and popular historians as an epochal battle. One that saw, for the first time, a Mongol advance that experienced their first major defeat and a permanent halt to forward movements.

According to Ahmad Yousef al-Hassan, Arabic military treatises of the 14th centuries state that the hand cannon was used by the Mamluk side in the Battle of Ain Jalut to frighten the Mongol armies, making it the earliest known battle for hand cannon being used. The compositions of the gunpowder used in the cannon were also given in those manuals. Hassan's claims are contradicted by other historians such as David Ayalon, Iqtidar Alam Khan, Joseph Needham, Tonio Andrade, and Gabor Ágoston. Khan argues that it was the Mongols who introduced gunpowder to the Islamic world, and believes cannons only reached Mamluk Egypt in the 1370s.

According to Needham, fire lances or proto-guns were known to Muslims by the late 13th century and early 14th century. However the term midfa, dated to textual sources from 1342 to 1352, cannot be proven to be true hand-guns or bombards, and contemporary accounts of a metal-barrel cannon in the Islamic world do not occur until 1365. Needham also concludes that in its original form the term midfa refers to the tube or cylinder of a naphtha projector (flamethrower), then after the invention of gunpowder it meant the tube of fire lances, and eventually it applied to the cylinder of hand-gun and cannon. Similarly, Andrade dates the textual appearance of cannon in middle eastern sources to the 1360s. However, such claim contradicts other historians who claim hand cannons did not appear in the Middle East until the 14th century.

A recent study claims that the Mongol defeat was in part caused by a short term climate anomaly following the eruption of Samalas volcano a few years earlier, stating that "a return to warmer and dryer conditions in the summer of 1260 CE, [...] likely reduced the regional carrying capacity and may therefore have forced a mass withdrawal of the Mongols from the region that contributed to the Mamluks’ victory."

=== Modern ===
One of the three original brigades of the Palestine Liberation Army was named "Ain Jalut", after the battle. In July 1970, Yasser Arafat referred to the modern area in the context of the historical battle:

This will not be the first time that our people has vanquished its enemies. The Mongols came and swept away the Abbasid caliphate, then they came to Ain Jalut in our land – in the same region where we are today fighting the Zionists – and they were defeated at Ain Jalut.
