= Nur ad-Din Shahanshah =

Kurdish military commander and Saladin's eldest brother (d. 1148)

- Died: 1148; Damascus
- Spouse: Khutlu-Khayr bint Ibrahim (wife)
- Children: Farrukh Shah (son); Al-Muzaffar I Umar (son); Adhra Khatun (daughter)
- Relatives: Saladin (brother)
- Military career
- Allegiance: Zengids
- Rank: Emir
- Nickname: Nur Al-Dawla
- Conflicts: Second Crusade; Siege of Damascus (1148); †

Emir Nur Al-Dawla Shahanshah ibn Najm al-Dīn Ayyūb ibn Shādhi ibn Marwan, or simply Shahanshah, was the eldest son of the Kurdish mercenary Najm al-Dīn Ayyūb, thus brother of Saladin and military commander of Zengid Emirate. He was the father of Farrukh Shah and Al-Muzaffar I Umar.

Shahanshah who was emir of Baalbek was killed in an engagement against the crusaders during the Siege of Damascus in 1148.
