= Ayyubid campaign in Jazira =

1234 military campaign in Mesopotamia

Ayyubid campaign in Jazira (1234-1237)
- The province of Al-Jazira
Date	1234-1235-1237
Location	Jazira region, including Edessa, Harran, and Dunaysir
Result	Inconclusive § Outcome
Territorial changes	Capture of Edessa and Harran by Ayyubid forces

Belligerents
Ayyubid Sultanate; Sultanate of Homs and Hama	Sultanate of Rum Mongol Empire

Commanders and leaders
Al-Kamil; Al-Ashraf; Al-Mujahid; Al-Muzaffar; Al-Salih; Al-Nasir; Sawab Al-Adili; Baha Al-Din (POW)	Alā ad-Dīn Kayqubad I #; Al-Qaymari

Strength
(In 1234); 27,000 (Under Sawab); 5000 soldiers (Under Al-Muzaffar); 2,500 horsemen	(Total strength); 15,000 (Under Al-Qaymari); 12,000 soldiers (Under Ala Ad-Din); 3,000 horsemen

Casualties and losses
Many soldiers were killed or captured	half of the soldiers were expelled by Al-Muzaffar

The Ayyubid campaign in Jazira (1234–1237) was a military campaign led by the Ayyubid sultan Al-Kamil in 632 AH (1234 CE) against Seljuk held territories in the Jazira region of northern Mesopotamia. The campaign resulted in the capture of key cities such as Edessa and Harran, but also the losses of the position in certain areas of the region, it was also ultimately interrupted by a new Mongol incursion into the region, forcing the Ayyubid forces to withdraw.

== Background ==
During the early 13th century, the Ayyubid Sultanate sought to consolidate its authority across northern Mesopotamia and Syria. The Jazira region, lying between the Euphrates and Tigris rivers, was strategically important due to its fortified cities, agricultural resources, and position along major trade routes.

The decline of Seljuk authority in certain frontier regions created opportunities for Ayyubid expansion. However, rival Muslim dynasties, including the Artuqids of Mardin, sometimes cooperated with Seljuk forces, complicating Ayyubid efforts to establish stable control.

At the same time, the emergence of the Mongol Empire posed an increasing threat to the political balance of the region, with Mongol forces conducting raids into northern Mesopotamia during the early 13th century.

== Campaign ==
=== Al-Kamil’s campaign of Anatolia ===
In 631/1234 news arrived in Cairo that al-Kamil had entered the territory of the Seljuks of Anatolia (Rum), that he had seized Hisn Mansur, passed the village of Ra'aban, transited the mountain pass called al-Darabandat, and then reached a third pass

In 1234, when Al-Kamil's soldiers were coming to Khartpert (Modern day Harput), they were surprised by the Seljuk forces of Ala Al-Din and saw the city fell into his hands, Al-Kamil was then compelled and forced to withdraw and instead sent his nephew Al-Muzaffar Mahmud along with the other emirs. They arrived before Ala al-Din, but Ala al-Din attacked and defeated them, being no more than 3,000 horsemen.

=== Siege of Harput (1234) ===
Al-Kamil advanced into Rum, but Ala al-din's army blocked his route near al-Darband (mountain pass) and forced him to retreat. He then moved toward Khartpert, where his forces were defeated, took refuge in the city, and eventually surrendered. The King of Rum spared them, and Ala al-Din took control of Khartpert.

Ala al-Din besieged Khartpert for 24 days, causing severe hunger and shortages for the 12,000 inside. Al-Muzaffar, seeing the desperate situation, negotiated surrender by sending his emir Baha Al-Din into captivity. Ala al-Din granted safe passage, accepted al-Muzaffar and his men, took control of Khartpert and its seven fortresses, and compensated its ruler with lands in Rum. Al-Muzaffar and the remaining troops then returned to al-Kamil.

=== Advance across the Euphrates ===
In early 633 AH (1235 CE), Sultan Al-Kamil organized a coalition army composed of leading Ayyubid rulers, including Al-Ashraf Musa, Al-Mujahid of Homs, and Al-Muzaffar Mahmud of Hama. The combined forces crossed the Euphrates River and advanced into Seljuk-controlled territory.

The first major objective of the campaign was the city of Edessa, a strategically important fortress city in northern Mesopotamia.

=== Capture of Edessa ===
Edessa fell to Ayyubid forces after a successful assault. Following its capture, Al-Kamil ordered the destruction of the city's citadel to prevent its future use as a fortified Seljuk stronghold.

=== Capture of Harran ===
After securing Edessa, Ayyubid forces advanced toward Harran, another key urban center. Harran was taken without major resistance, further consolidating Ayyubid control in the region.

=== Campaign against Dunaysir ===
Following the capture of Harran, Al-Kamil launched a campaign against Dunaysir (modern day Kızıltepe), targeting the Artuqids prince of Mardin. This action was taken in reprisal for Artuqids support provided to Seljuk forces during earlier conflicts.

=== Mongol incursion ===
During the operations near Dunaysir, Ayyubid commanders received reports from Mosul that Mongol forces had entered the Jazira region. The Mongols advanced as far as Sinjar, marking a significant escalation of their activity in northern Mesopotamia.

== Outcome ==
The campaign resulted in several immediate outcomes. The Siege of Harput in 1234 weakened Ayyubid positions in the region and played a major role in the campaign. The cities of Edessa and Harran were captured by Ayyubid forces. Seljuk positions in the Jazira were significantly weakened. Ayyubid military operations were halted due to the Mongol advance.

Faced with an imminent threat from the Mongols, the Abbasid caliph al-Mustansir sent an embassy led by Muhyi al-Din Ibn al-Jawzi reconcile 'Ala' al-Din and al-Kamil and seek their assistance. This embassy arrived in Egypt in late 634/early 1237 In the History, Yusab relates that in this year an envoy from the caliph, one of the greatest jurists in Baghdad, arrived in Egypt and met al-Kamil in Damietta. The envoy proposed making peace between al-Kamil and the King of Rum ('Ala' al-Din). Al-Kamil agreed and sent his own envoy with the jurist to Kayseri, the capital of the Kingdom of Rum. However, the King of Rum died (4 Shawwal 634/31 May 1237) before they arrived. His son and successor (Ghiyath al-Din Kaykhusraw II) set free the Ayyubid troops from Egypt and Syria whom his father had taken prisoners.
