= Sitti Sawda =

Sitti Sawda or Sawda bint al-Faqih (died 1242), was the wife of sultan Al-Kamil of Egypt (r. 1218–1238). She was the mother of sultan Al-Adil II (r. 1238–1240) and stepmother of sultan As-Salih Ayyub (r. 1240–1249). She was famously politically influential, and is one of few freeborn wives to have played any significant role in the Ayyubid dynasty, who normally used slaves for procreation.

== Life ==
Sitti Sawda was born to Sheikh Rasr Al-Faqih. Normally, the sultans used slave concubines for procreation, and Sitti Sawda is one of the few free women to become the wives of the Ayyubid sultans and play an influential role. She married Prince Al-Kamil before he became a sultan and was given a dominant role in the Ayyubid harem after his succession to the throne in 1218.

She has traditionally been described as a cunning and scheming woman who convinced her husband to select his son with her, Saif al-Din, to be heir before his elder son, Najm al-Din, with the argument that Najm al-Din was the son of a Black slave concubine, while Saif al-Din was the son of a legal Muslim Arab wife; she also claimed that Najm al-Din was ambitious and would destroy the Ayyubid state. She convinced her husband to appoint her stepson governor of Syria in order to remove him from Egypt and give her own son a better position to claim the throne when her husband died.

=== Sultan mother ===
In 1238 her husband died. She used her slaves Ward al-Muni and Nour al-Sabah as mediators to assist the help of Fakhr al-Din Ibn Sheikh al-Shuyukh from inside the royal harem.

With the help of Fakhr al-Din Ibn Sheikh al-Shuyukh and Prince Rukn al-Din al-Hijawi, she managed to place her son on the throne.

However, her son was not a capable ruler and has been described as corrupted by indulging too much in slave concubines.

Ibn Sheikh al-Shuyukh regretted having helped her son to power, and her stepson imprisoned her slave-messengers Ward al-Muni and Nour al-Sabah. She wrote to her uncles Mujir al-Din bin al-Adil I, Taqi al-Din bin al-Adil I and al-Salih Ismail bin al-Adil I, and claimed that her stepson was planning to have them killed. Her letter caused her uncle Al-Salih Ismail, Emir of Damascus, to attack Damascus and his betrayal of Najm al-Din, and his murder of her stepson Najm al-Din's son, Al-Mughith Omar.

The instability of her son's regime to control a growing anarchy, which caused his dethronement by her stepson in 1240.

=== Later life ===
When her stepson Najm al-Din deposed her son and took power in 1240, he imprisoned her son and ordered her to be imprisoned. She fled with two concubines to Al-Karak Castle with Al-Nasir, where she lived for two years until her death in 1242.
