= Al-Adil II =

Ayyubid sultan of Egypt (r. 1238 – 1240)

Sayf ad-Din Abu Bakr II
- Al-Malik al-Adil
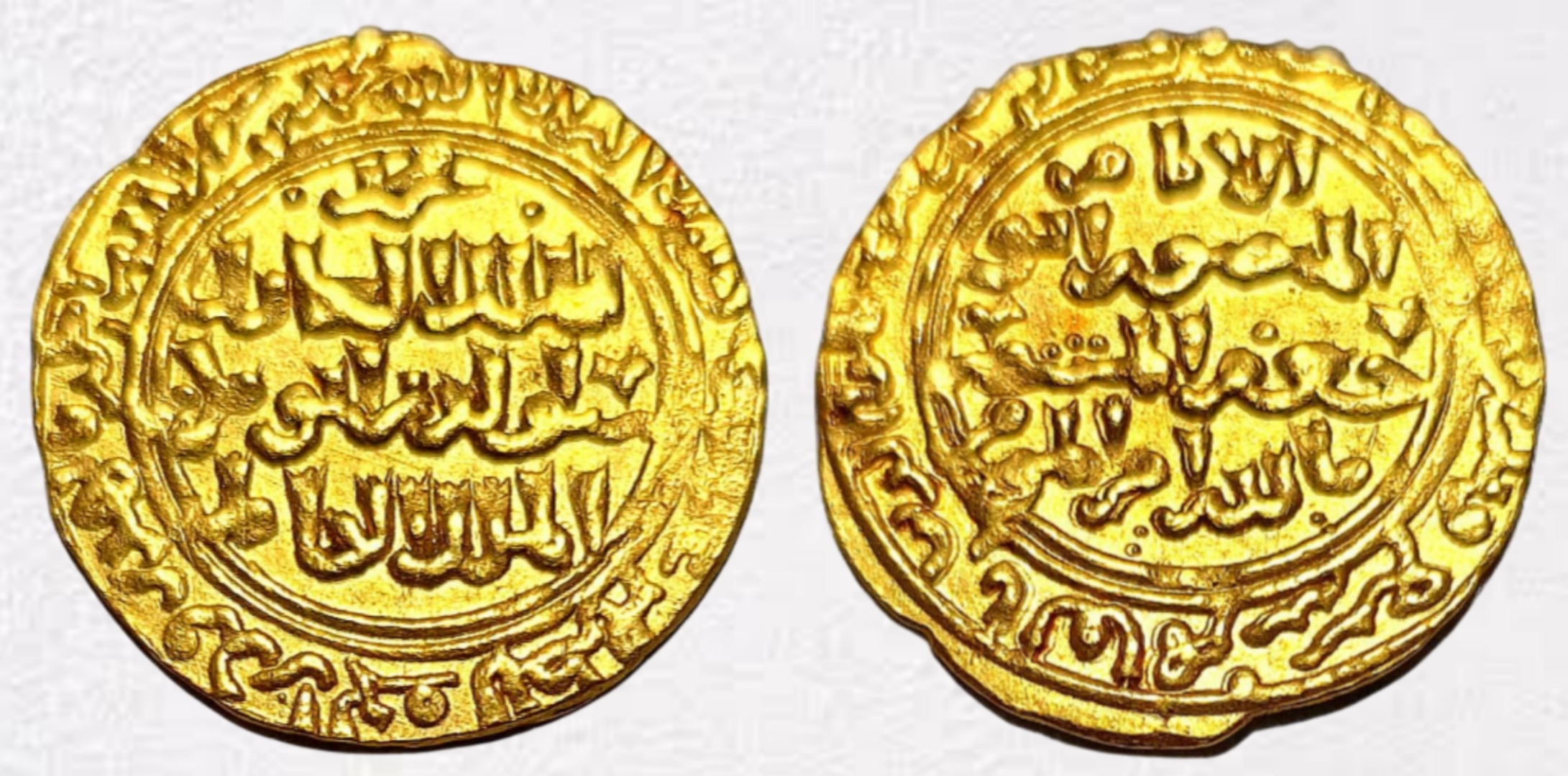
- A gold dirham minted during the reign of Al-Adil II in 637 AH, citing Abbasid caliph al-Mustansir

Sultan of Egypt
- Reign: 6 March 1238 – 1240
- Predecessor: Al-Kamil
- Successor: As-Salih Ayyub

Emir of Damascus
- Reign: 6 March 1238 – 1239
- Predecessor: Al-Kamil
- Successor: As-Salih Ayyub
- Born: c. 1221
- Died: 9 February 1248 (aged c. 27)
Names
- Al-ʿĀdil Sayf ad-Dīn Abū Bakr ibn Muhammad ibn Abu Bakr ibn Ayyub
- Dynasty: Ayyubid
- Father: Al-Kamil
- Mother: Sitti Sawda
- Religion: Sunni Islam

Al-Malik al-ʿĀdil Sayf ad-Dīn Abū Bakr ibn Nāṣir ad-Dīn Muḥammad (Arabic: سيف الدين الملك العادل أبو بكر بن ناصر الدين محمد, better known as al-Adil II) (c. 1221 – 9 February 1248) was the Ayyubid Sultan of Egypt from 1238 to 1240.

== Rule ==
When his father al-Kamil, nephew of Saladin, died in 1238, al-Adil II followed him somewhat unprepared. When the country plunged into anarchy, his exiled half-brother, as-Salih Ayyub, seized the opportunity and deposed him. Al-Adil died in prison eight years later.

Contemporary Muslim historians wrote disapprovingly about al-Adil II's "boisterous living and loose morals". This is seemingly corroborated by an inlaid brass basin made for him by the master craftsman Ahmad al-Dhaki al-Mawsili which contains a "somewhat risqué" depiction of total nudity, the only known example from medieval Islamic metalwork.

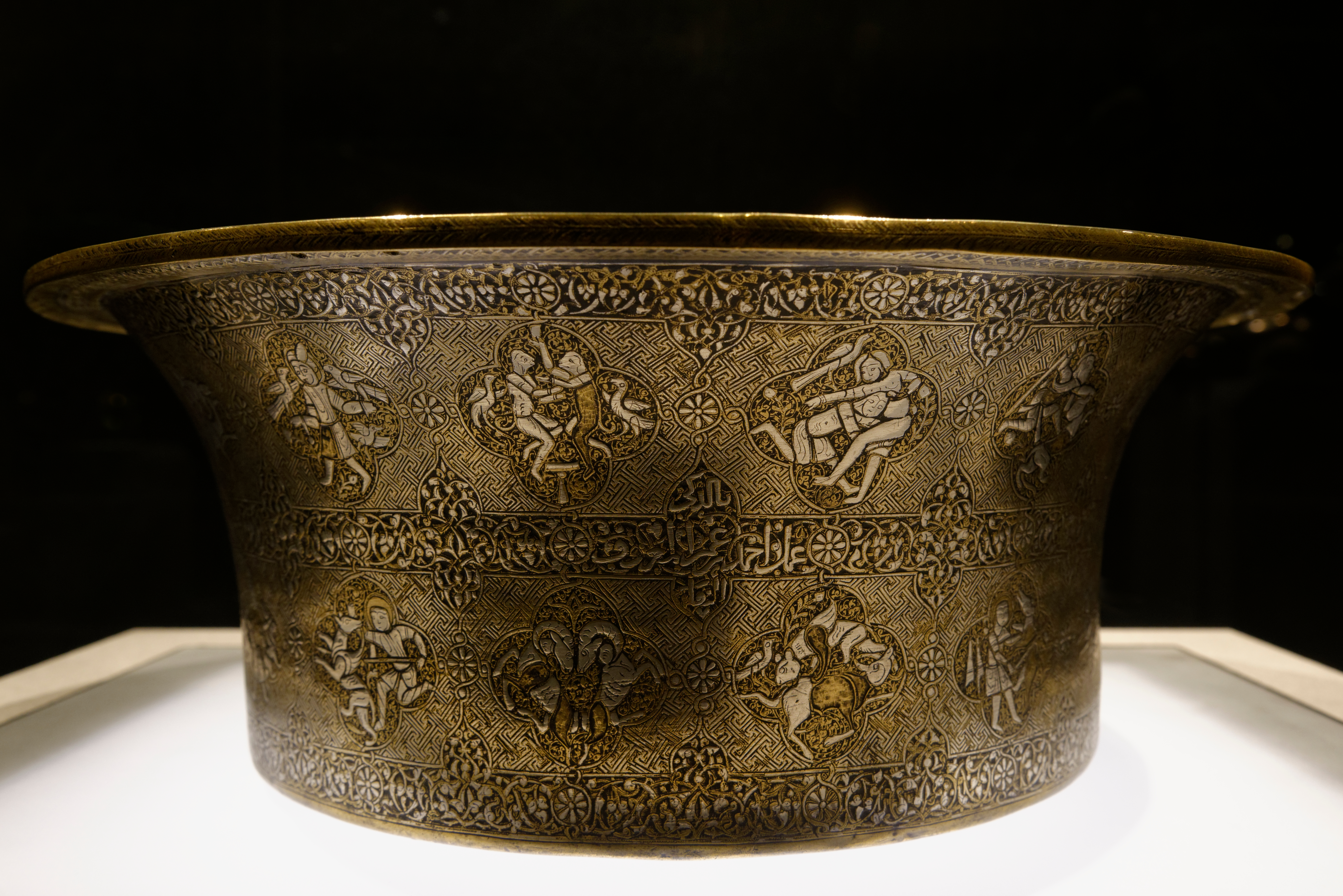
Basin made by Ahmad al-Dhaki al-Mawsili for al-Adil II, 1238-1240. Louvre Museum.

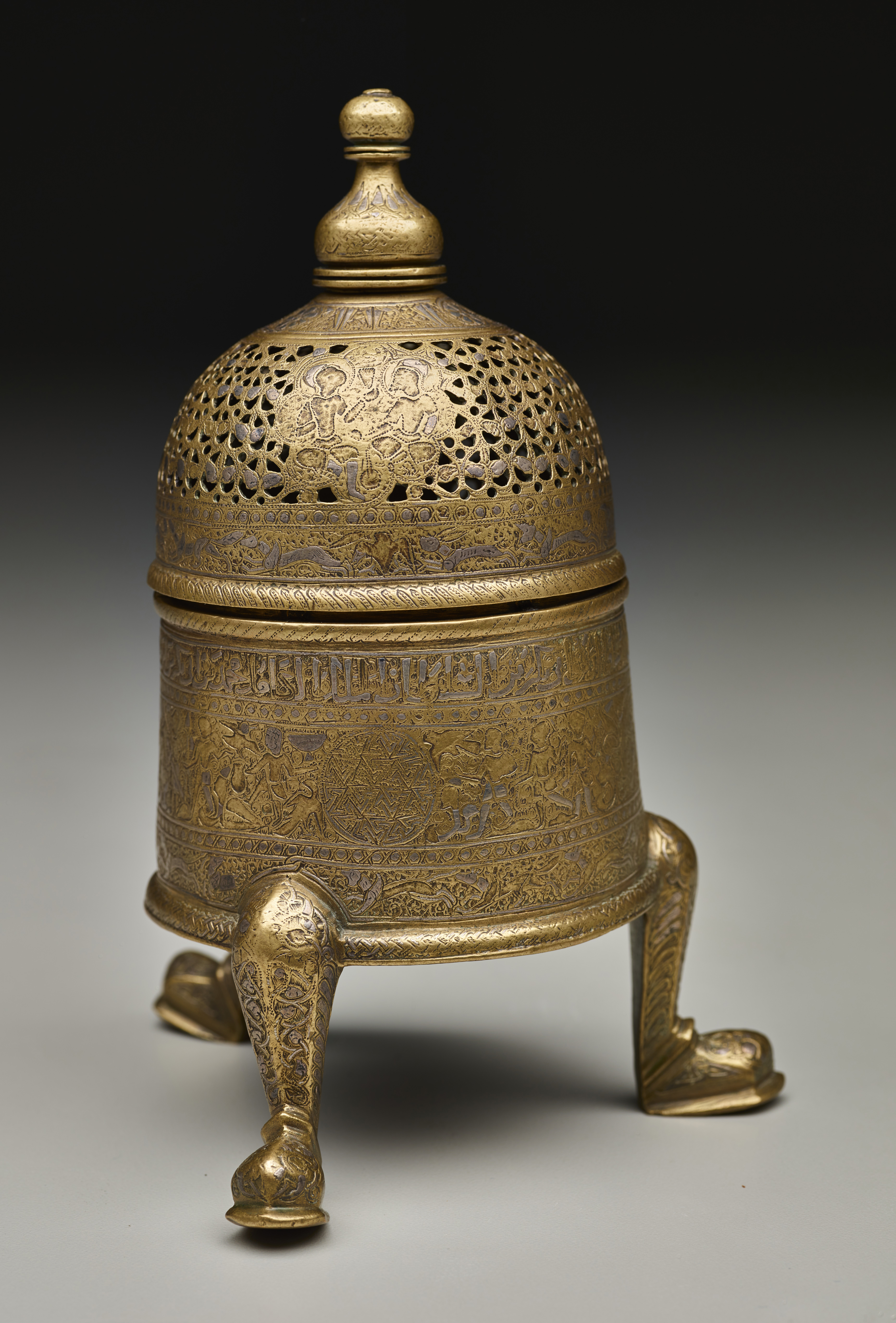
Incense burner of Sultan al-Adil II.

== See also ==
- List of rulers of Egypt

Al-Adil II Ayyubid dynasty Born: c. 1221 Died: 9 February 1248
Preceded by Al-Kamil	Sultan of Egypt; 6 March 1238 – 1240	Succeeded by As-Salih Ayyub
Preceded by Al-Kamil	Emir of Damascus; 6 March 1238 – 1239	Succeeded by As-Salih Ayyub
