= Al-Kamil =

Ayyubid sultan of Egypt from 1218 to 1238

Nasir ad-Din Muhammad
- Al-Malik al-Kamil
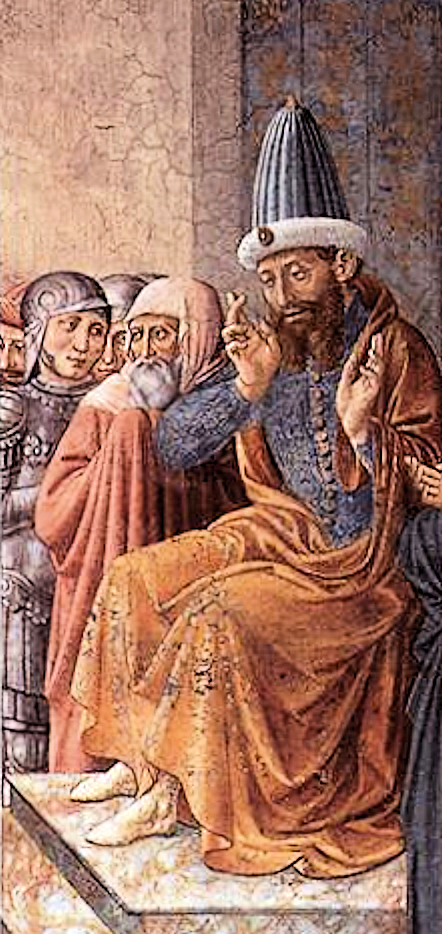
- Al-Kamil enthroned, in Benozzo Gozzoli Scenes from the Life of St Francis, 1452

Sultan of Egypt
- Reign: 31 August 1218 – 6 March 1238
- Predecessor: Al-Adil I
- Successor: Al-Adil II

Sultan of Damascus
- Reign: 1238
- Predecessor: As-Salih Ismail
- Successor: Al-Adil II
- Born: 1177; Cairo, Ayyubid Sultanate
- Died: 6 March 1238 (aged 60–61); Damascus, Ayyubid Sultanate
- Consort: Wird al-Mana; Sitti Sawda; Adschība
- Issue: As-Salih Ayyub; Al-Adil II; Ashura Khatun; Fatma Khatun
Names
- al-Malik al-Kamil Naser ad-Din Abu al-Maʽali Muhammad
- Dynasty: Ayyubid
- Father: Al-Adil I
- Religion: Sunni Islam

Al-Malik al-Kamil Nasir ad-Din Muhammad (Arabic: الملك الكامل ناصر الدين محمد; c. 1177 – 6 March 1238), titled Abu al-Maʽali (Arabic: أبي المعالي), was an Egyptian ruler and the fourth Ayyubid sultan of Egypt. During his tenure as sultan, the Ayyubids defeated the Fifth Crusade. He was known to the Latin/Frankish crusaders as Meledin, a name by which he is usually referred to in older Western sources and often but less frequently continues to be. As a result of the Sixth Crusade, he ceded West Jerusalem to the Christians and is known to have met with Saint Francis.

== Biography ==
=== Jazira campaign ===
Al-Kamil was the son of the Kurdish sultan al-Adil ("Saphadin"), a brother of Saladin. Al-Kamil's father was laying siege to the city of Mardin (in modern-day Turkey) in 1199 when he was called away urgently to deal with a security threat in Damascus. Al-Adil left al-Kamil to command the forces around Mardin continuing the siege. Taking advantage of the Sultan's absence, the combined forces of Mosul, Sinjar and Jazirat ibn Umar appeared at Mardin when it was on the point of surrender, and drew Al-Kamil into battle. Although he was badly defeated and retreated to Mayyafariqin, dissent and weakness among his opponents meant that Al-Kamil was able to secure Ayyubid rule in the Jazira Region by taking Harran (in modern-day Turkey).

=== Viceroy of Egypt ===
In 1200, after proclaiming himself Sultan, Al-Adil invited Al-Kamil to come from the Eastern Territories to join him in Egypt as his viceroy (na'ib) in that country. Al-Adil's second son, Al-Mu'azzam Isa, had already been made prince of Damascus in 1198. It appears that Al-Adil allowed Al-Kamil a fairly high degree of authority, since he oversaw much of the work on the Cairo Citadel, issued decrees in his own name, and even managed to persuade his father to dismiss the powerful minister Ibn Shukr. Al-Kamil remained viceroy until his father's death in 1218 when he became Sultan himself.

=== The Fifth Crusade ===
When Al-Adil died on 31 August 1218, the Ayyubid domains were divided into three parts, with Al-Kamil ruling Egypt, his brother Al-Muazzam Isa ruling in Palestine and Transjordan, and a third brother, Al-Ashraf Musa in Syria and the Jazira. Nominally the other two recognised Al-Kamil's supremacy as Sultan. Unusually for an Ayyubid succession, there was no obvious dissent or rivalry between the brothers at this point, partly because just before Al-Adil's death, Egypt had been attacked by the forces of the Fifth Crusade.

Al-Kamil took command of the forces which defended Damietta against the Crusaders. In 1219 he was almost overthrown by a conspiracy led by the amir Imad ad-Din ibn al-Mashtub, commander of the Hakkari Kurdish regiment, to replace him with his younger and more pliant brother al-Faiz Ibrahim. Alerted to the conspiracy, Al-Kamil had to flee the camp to safety and in the ensuing confusion the Crusaders were able to tighten their grip on Damietta. Al-Kamil considered fleeing to Yemen, which was ruled by his son al-Mas'ud Yusuf, but the timely arrival of his brother Al-Muazzam from Syria with reinforcements brought the conspiracy to a swift end.

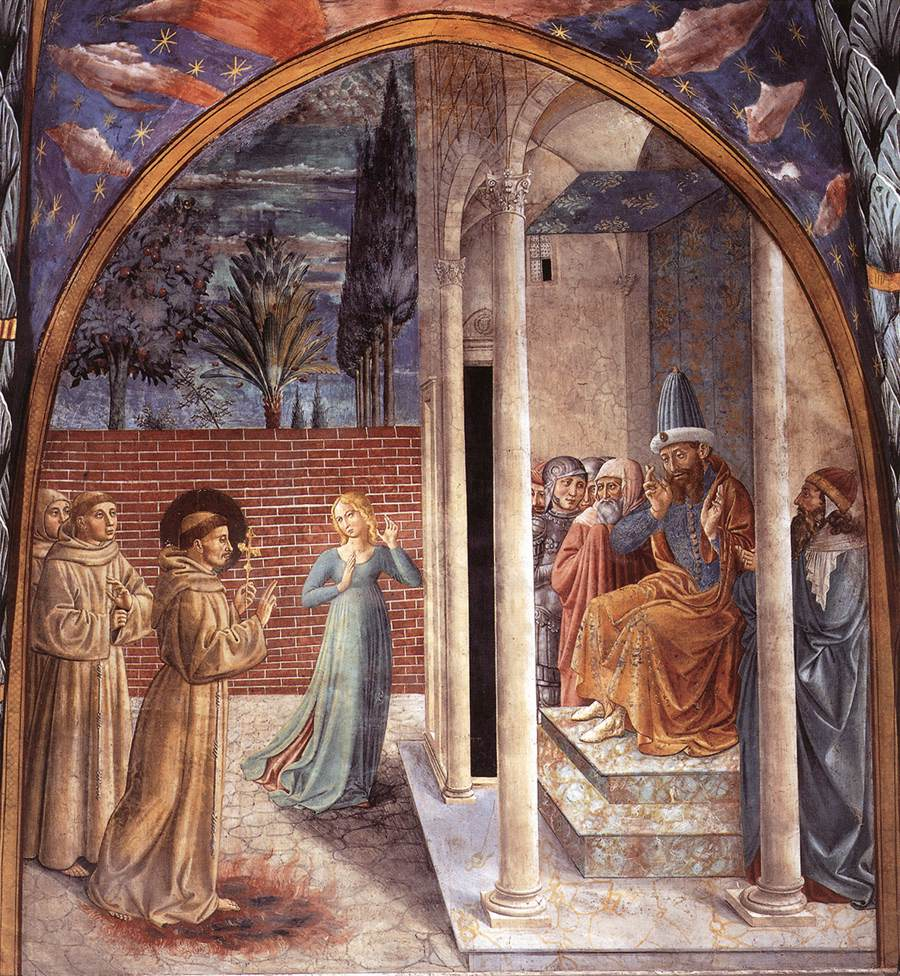
Francis of Assisi and Illuminatus of Arce with the Sultan al-Kamil during the Fifth Crusade. 15th century. By Benozzo Gozzoli.

Al-Kamil made many offers of peace to the Crusaders, all of which were rejected, due to the influence of the papal legate Pelagius. He offered to return Jerusalem and rebuild its walls (which his brother had torn down earlier in the year), and to return the True Cross (which he probably did not have). At one point he even met with Francis of Assisi, who had accompanied the crusade. Their meeting became a subject for painters like Giotto, Taddeo di Bartolo and Taddeo Gaddi.

Due to famine and disease after the Nile failed to flood, al-Kamil could not defend Damietta and it was captured in November 1219. The sultan withdrew to al-Mansourah, a fortress further up the Nile. After this there was little action until 1221, when al-Kamil offered peace again, proposing to surrender the entire territory of the Kingdom of Jerusalem, except Transjordan, in return for the Crusaders evacuating Egypt but was again refused. The Crusaders marched out towards Cairo, but al-Kamil simply opened the dams and allowed the Nile to flood, and finally the Crusaders accepted an eight-year peace. He retook Damietta in September.

=== Power struggle and the treaty of 1229 ===
In the following years there was a power struggle with his brother al-Mu'azzam, and al-Kamil was willing to accept a peace with emperor and King of Sicily Frederick II, who was planning the Sixth Crusade. Al-Mu'azzam died in 1227, eliminating the need for a peace, but Frederick had already arrived in Palestine. After al-Mu'azzam's death, al-Kamil and his other brother al-Ashraf negotiated a treaty, giving all of Palestine (including Transjordan) to al-Kamil and Syria to al-Ashraf. In February 1229 al-Kamil negotiated the Treaty of Jaffa, a ten-year peace with Frederick II and returned Jerusalem and other holy sites to the Crusader kingdom.

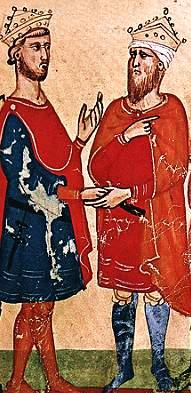
Al-Kamil (right) meeting Frederick II, in a mid 14th century manuscript of the Nuova Cronica

The treaty of 1229 is unique in the history of the Crusades. By diplomacy alone and without major military confrontation, Jerusalem, Bethlehem, and a corridor running to the sea were ceded to the kingdom of Jerusalem. Exception was made for the Temple area, the Dome of the Rock, and the Aqsa Mosque, which the Muslims retained. Moreover, all current Muslim residents of the city would retain their homes and property. They would also have their own city officials to administer a separate justice system and safeguard their religious interests. The walls of Jerusalem, which had been destroyed, were rebuilt, and the peace was to last for 10 years.

After the treaty with Frederick, al-Kamil turned his attention to Damascus. He sent al-Ashraf to begin operations against the city. He arrived to pen the siege of Damascus on 6 May. After almost two months of intense fighting, the city surrendered on 25 June. It was given to al-Ashraf, while al-Muazzam's son, an-Nasir Dawud, had to settle for Transjordan.

=== Later years ===
Although there was peace with the Crusaders, al-Kamil had to contend with the Seljuks and the Khwarezmians before he died in 1238.

His sons as-Salih Ayyub and al-Adil II succeeded him in Syria and Egypt respectively, but the Ayyubid empire soon descended into civil war. In 1239 the treaty with Frederick expired, and Jerusalem came under Ayyubid control.

== Personality ==
Al-Kamil exemplified the Islamic laws of war. Oliver of Paderborn, an eyewitness to the Fifth Crusade, describes the generosity shown by al-Kamil's forces to the defeated Crusaders after their surrender. Gavigan’s 1948 translation of Oliver states: “Who could doubt that such kindness, mildness, and mercy proceeded from God?” and then that those whom the Crusaders had harmed “refreshed us with their own food as we were dying of hunger.” However, van Moolenbroek notes a misreading in Gavigan's translation of this passage of Hoogeweg’s 1894 edition of the Latin text.

Al-Kamil is mentioned several times in the first chapter of Zofia Kossak's 1944 novel "Blessed Are the Meek."

== See also ==
- List of rulers of Egypt
- Ayyubid campaign in Jazira

Al-Kamil Ayyubid dynasty Born: 1177 Died: 6 March 1238
Preceded by Al-Adil I	Sultan of Egypt; 1218 – 6 March 1238	Succeeded by Al-Adil II
Preceded by As-Salih Ismail	Sultan of Damascus; 1238	Succeeded by Al-Adil II
