= Adschība (qiyan) =

Ayyubid poet (c. 1218)

Adschība (fl. 1218), was a qiyan poet and musician, active in Ayyubid Egypt.

She was a member of the Ayyubid harem as the royal slave concubine of Sultan Al-Kamil (r. 1218–1238).

Adschība was described as a beautiful and accomplished singer. Her enslaver, the fourth Ayyubid Sultan Al-Kamil Muhammad al-Malik, was claimed to have been deeply in love with her and often summoned her to his bed. She reportedly attended in his audiences, but hidden behind a curtain as well as openly, and played the harp and the frame drum.

In Classical Arabic literature, she is included in Masālik al-abṣār fī mamālik al-amṣār by Ibn Fadlallah al-Umari (1301–1349), in the main work describing famous slave singers of history.
