= Ahmad al-Dhaki al-Mawsili =

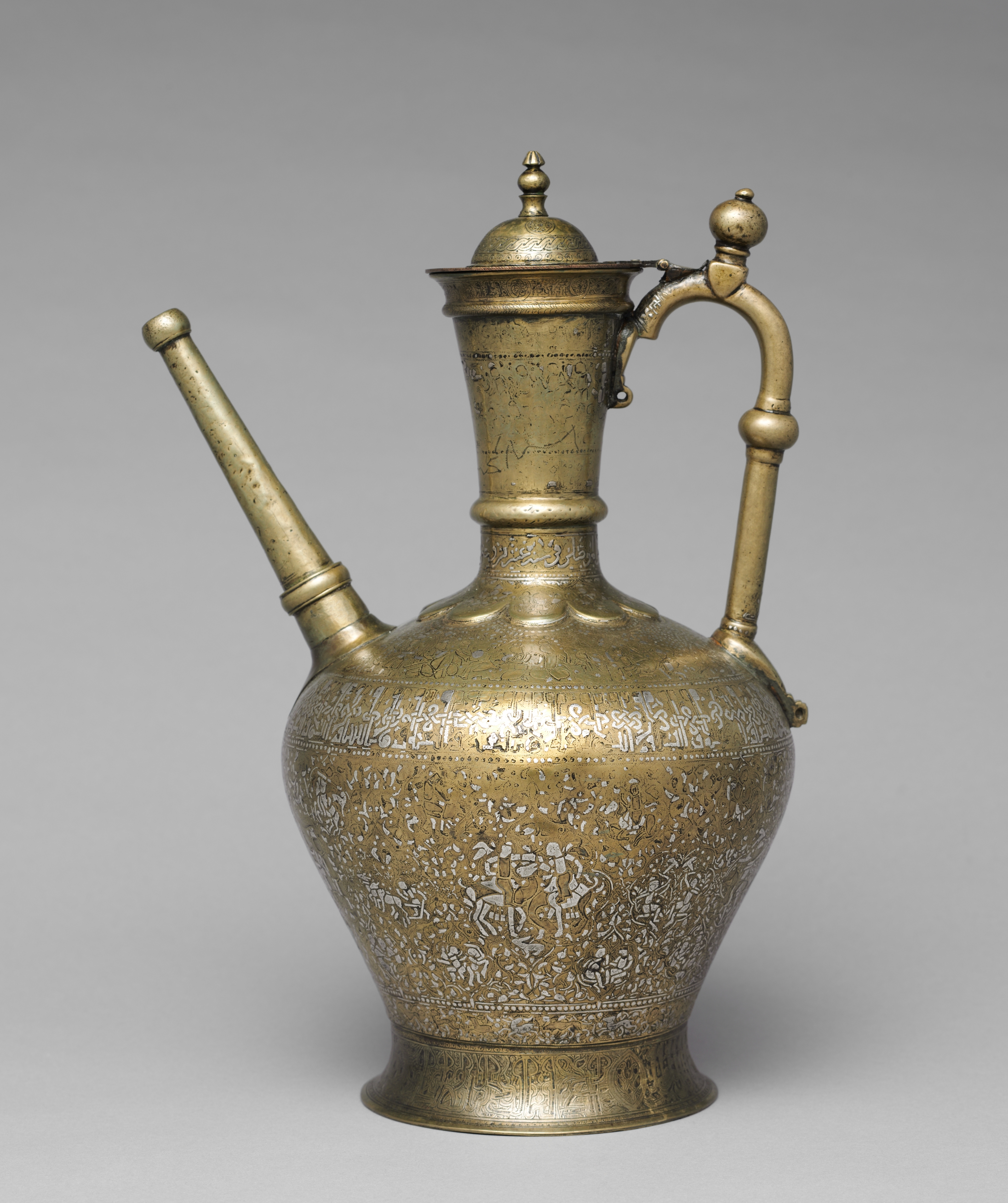
The Cleveland ewer, made by al-Dhaki in 1223, has been heavily weathered over time and most of its original silver inlay has been lost.

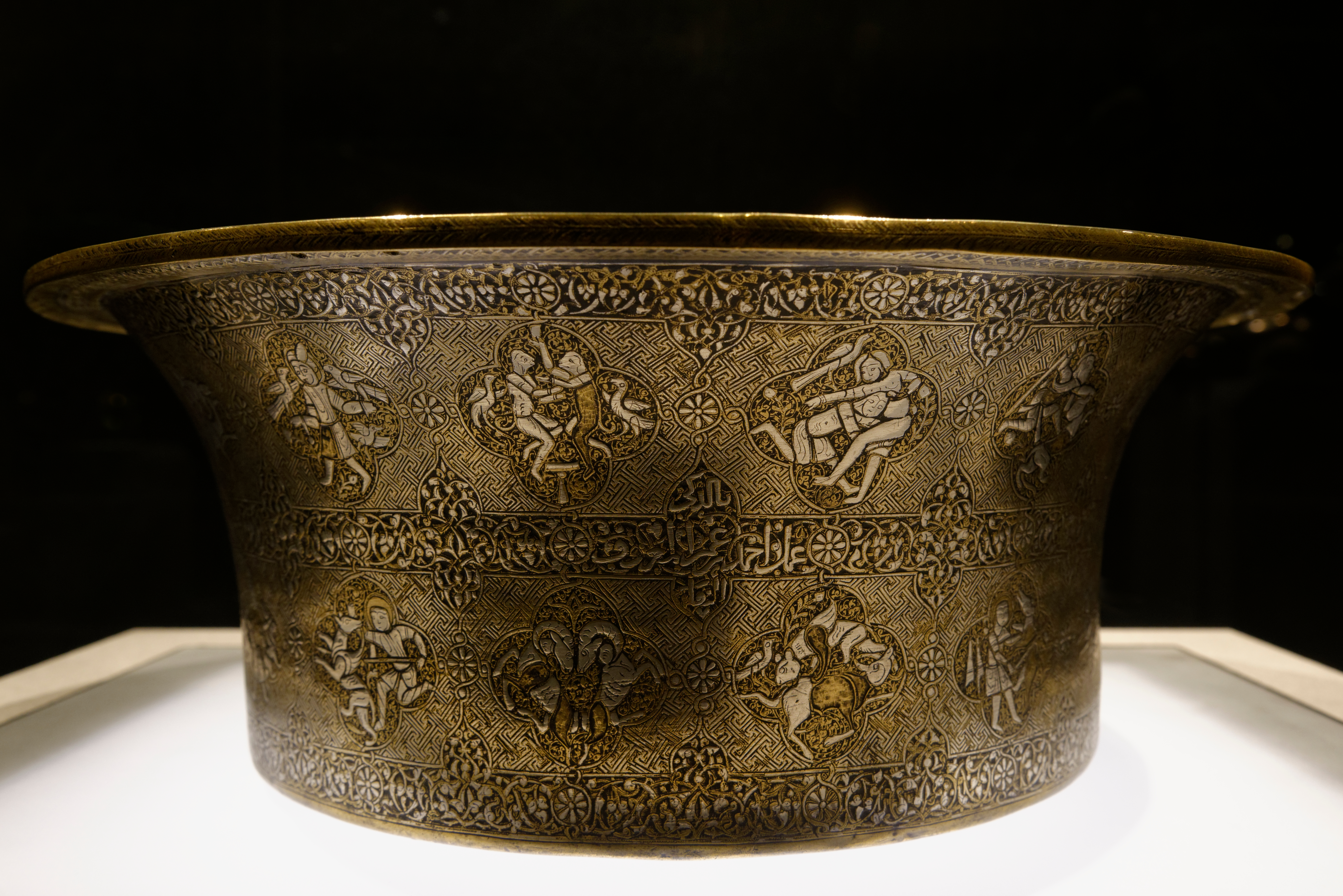
The Louvre basin, made by al-Dhaki for the Ayyubid sultan al-Adil II sometime during his short reign of 1238 to 1240.

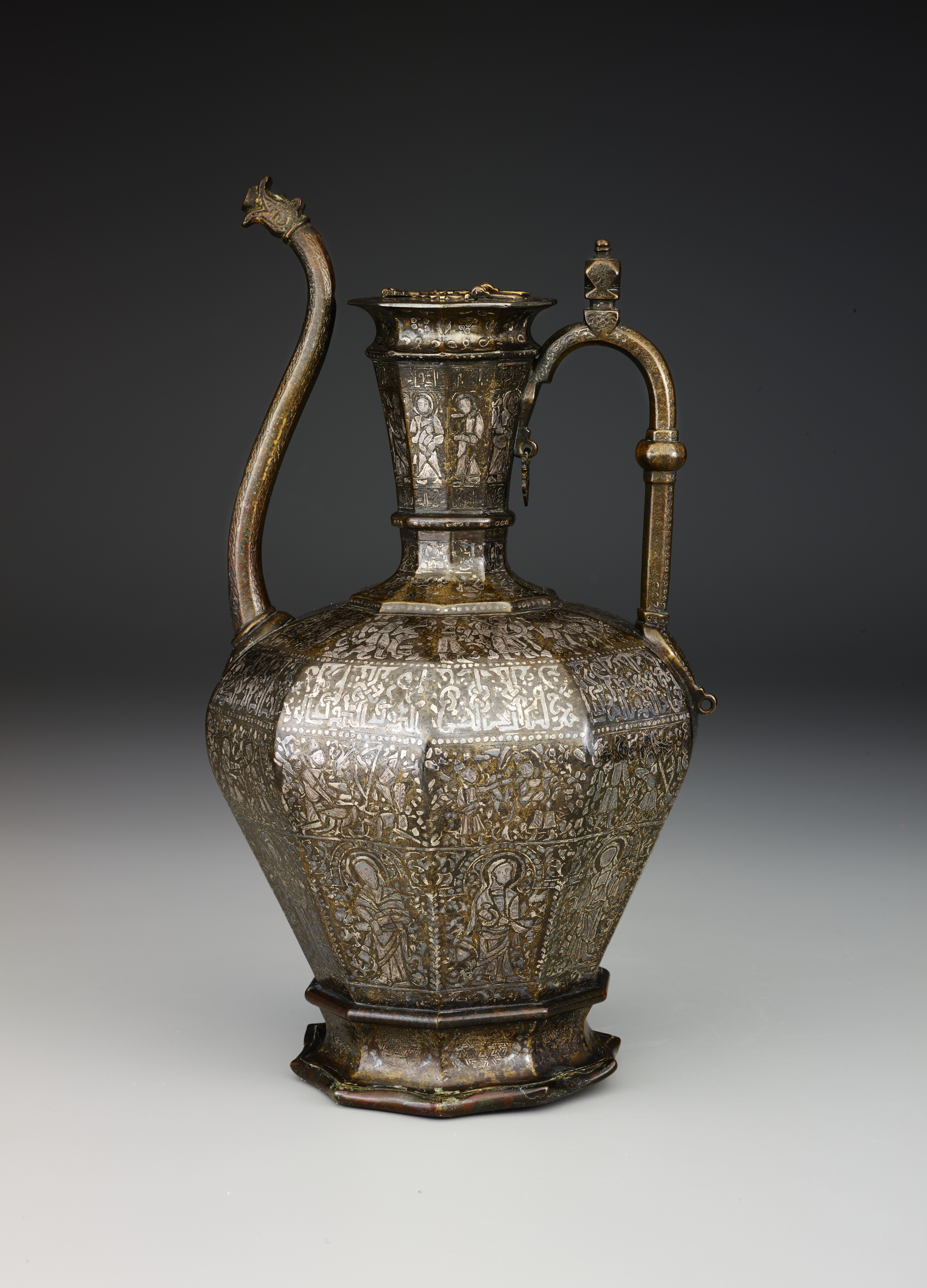
The Homberg ewer, made by al-Dhaki in 1242-3. The original spout was straight and has been lost, and the original inlay has also been lost.

Aḥmad ibn 'Umar al-Dhakī al-Mawṣilī was a 13th-century metalworker from Mosul, now in Iraq. He is known from three surviving works over a period of about 20 years from 1223 to 1242–43. He operated an atelier (workshop) with his ghulam Abu Bakr Umar ibn Hajji Jaldak (probably not a slave but more of an assistant). The epithet "al-Dhaki" means "the sagacious".

== Life ==
D.S. Rice reconstructed al-Dhaki's career as follows. In the 1220s, al-Dhaki and Ibn Jaldak probably worked in a town under Artuqid control, possibly Amid, since a candlestick made by Ibn Jaldak has an incision marking ownership by "al-Malik al-Mas'ūd" - an epithet of Mawdūd ibn Maḥmūd, the last Artuqid emir of Amid. They were probably not active in Mosul itself, since that was the capital of Badr al-Din Lu'lu', an Artuqid rival. The Cleveland ewer, along with the two known works of Ibn Jaldak, are all characteristically Mesopotamian in style. After the fall of the Artuqids in 1232, al-Dhaki appears to have moved to Syria or Egypt, under Mamluk rule, in search of new royal patrons. The Louvre basin, made sometime before 1240, was still mostly Mesopotamian in style but with some subtle changes that suggest al-Dhaki was adapting his style to suit Syrian/Egyptian fashions. In the Homberg ewer of 1242, al-Dhaki was further adapting to Syrian trends.

On the other hand, Julian Raby criticized some of Rice's assumptions and argued that, instead, al-Dhaki likely worked in Mosul and his workshop exported items for more distant princes. Raby also noted two symbols that appear on al-Dhaki's works: an octagon filled with complex geometric patterns, and a relief rosette. These also appear on other works by artisans associated with Mosul, leading Raby to claim that "Ahmad al-Dhaki's workshop was intimately connected to others in Mosul" and that "he was surely not in Amid/Diyarbakır in the 1220s, as Rice proposed".

== Works ==
- The Cleveland ewer, made of brass and dated to 620 AH (1223 CE) and now on display at the Cleveland Museum of Art in the United States. There are some later additions: the base, the lower part of the spout that attaches to the body, and "the lid and the uppermost ring of the neck". It has been heavily weathered over time and most of its original silver inlay has been lost. Two later owners, Ḥusayn ibn Qāsim and Ustā al-Muḥtasib (this name is less clear and the reading is uncertain), scratched their names into the ewer's neck. At the bottom of the neck is al-Dhaki's signature and below that is a series of 10 raised semicircular spaces forming a "collar"; the decoration on these is badly worn. The body of the ewer is decorated with a series of 30 medallions (10 each in three levels) on a background of arabesque patterns. The 10 medallions in the central row include several depictions of hunting (including one where the hunters are shooting birds with a blowgun, which is one of only a handful of known depictions of this activity in Islamic art), an agricultural scene, a scene of two people riding camels with an unclear interpretation, a scene of musicians playing, a couple of pastoral scenes (including a unique one depicting a shepherd playing a flute), and a very unusual scene depicting a young man reclining on a couch in a "festive outdoor occasion". The smaller medallions in the top and bottom rows all feature fairly typical "stock-in-trade motifs".
- The Louvre basin, made for the Ayyubid sultan al-Adil II sometime between 1238 and 1240. There is an incision on the base which says the basin had belonged specifically to the vestry (ṭishtkhānah) of al-Adil. Another mark was left by a later owner, the Yemeni prince Ḥusayn ibn Muḥammad ibn Aḥmad, in 1775. The design on the inside of the bowl, especially at the bottom, is badly damaged by wear and tear. The inside is decorated with "lively" hunting scenes that convey a sense of depth through foreshortening (an early use of the technique) and making objects in the back smaller. The design at the bottom is a series of concentric circles with a group of strutting ducks in the middle (instead of the more common sun disk) surrounded by images of planets and the zodiac. There is also a band of writing in the naskh script which appears to contain lines from a poem but is too worn to be decipherable. The silver inlays on the outside are "almost perfectly preserved" and consist of interlinked swastikas divided into two main registers by three bands filled with arabesque patterns. Between them are a series of medallions depicting a variety of scenes - some common, others rare or unique. One depicts a team of acrobats, one male and one female; the male acrobat is only wearing a pair of short trousers while the female acrobat is completely naked, which is the only known depiction of nudity in medieval Islamic metalwork. D.S. Rice noted that the "somewhat risqué" nudity fits with contemporary Muslim historians' disapproving descriptions of al-Adil's "boisterous living and loose morals". Rice compared the Louvre basin favorably to the tray made anonymously for Badr al-Din Lu'lu and praised the "craftsmanship, originality of composition, and finesse of execution" of al-Dhaki's piece.
- The Homberg ewer, dated to 640 AH (1242 CE) and formerly part of the Octave Homberg collection. It has been heavily modified from its original form. The original spout, which was probably straight, has been lost and replaced by an awkwardly curved one. The base and the "upper ring of the neck" are later additions, although taken from other pieces from around the same time period. Most importantly, its original inlays have been completely lost and replaced with new ones which are anachronistically chased. The shapes of the original designs can be hard to make out. The Homberg ewer's incorporation of Christian themes is more characteristic of Syrian artistic trends than Mesopotamian ones, and Ahmad was probably living in Egypt or Syria when he made it. He was likely adopting a brief trend in mid-13th century Islamic metalwork from Syria that used Christian iconography (although somewhat haphazardly and carefully chosen so as to not offend potential Muslim buyers).
