= Khanqah al-Farafira =

13th-century Sufi monastery in Syria

Coordinates: 36°12′09″N 37°09′39″E

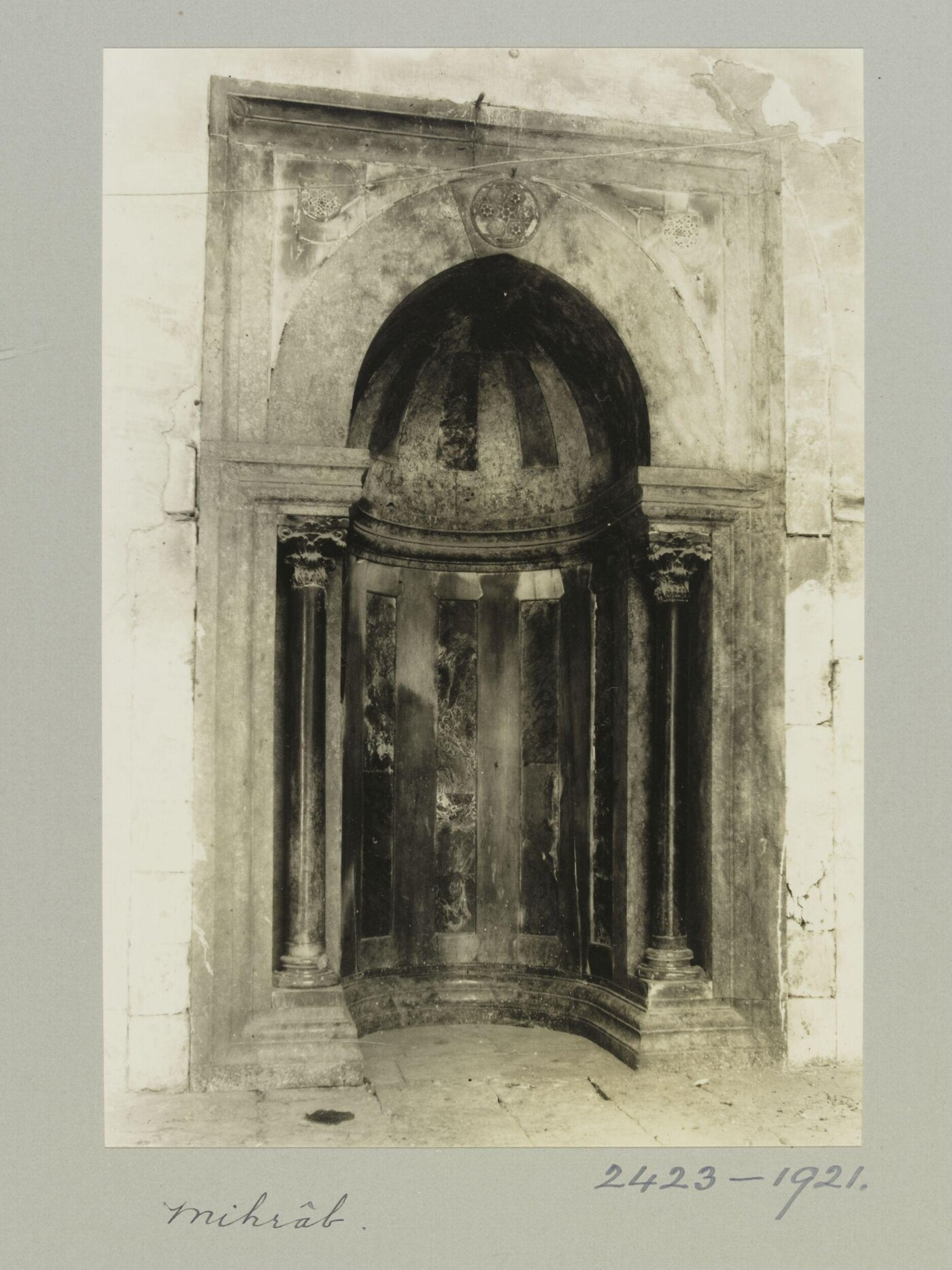
Gelatin silver print photograph of the khânaqâh's mihrab taken by K. A. C. Creswell, 1919.

The Khânaqâh al-Farafira (Arabic: خانقاه الفرافرة) is a 13th-century Sufi monastery in Aleppo, Syria, located in the al-Farafira quarter of the Ancient City and positioned north to the Citadel of Aleppo. The khânaqâh was built in 1237 by the efforts of Dayfa Khatun, the regent ruler of Aleppo from 1237 to 1244 and the wife of Az-Zahir Ghazi. At the time of its commission, it was the largest khânaqâh in the city. The building was a centre for sufis and dervishes. The original name of the building was ar-Ribāt al-Nasiri (Arabic: الرباط الناصري).

== Patronage ==
The Khânaqâh al-Farafira was likely built by Dayfa Khatun, queen regent of Aleppo and a prominent female patron who was active from 1237 to 1244. Female elites in Ayyubid Syria used patronage as an expression of power to legitimize their rule. Ibn Wāşil, a contemporary scholar, portrayed Dayfa Khatun as charitable to her subjects, often investing in religious and scholarly pursuits in his accounts. Among the buildings she commissioned is the Al-Firdaws Madrasa, a multifunctional complex that promoted religious education and served public functions. The Khânaqâh al-Farafira, though larger than most khânaqâhs in Aleppo during this time, bears similarities to the Al-Firdaws Madrasa in design of the portal, inscription, and mihrab though on a more modest scale. The inscription identifies the building as a ribāṭ built in 635 during Salah al-Din II’s rule, as Dayfa Khatun was acting regent in this year, the structure is commonly attributed to her. The building can also be attributed to Dayfa Khatun as during this period in Aleppo, there was a growing trend of female patrons commissioning religious institutions as an expression of wealth and piety .

== Function ==
Ibn Jubayr’s writing on Ancient Aleppo remains a vivid source of description into how khânaqâhs are defined. The term khânaqâh is equivalent to ribāṭ, both terms are used to describe a Sufi lodge. Khânaqâhs also show evidence of following a development plan similar to that of a madrasa: firstly a private building complex common in eastern Iran, which was then absorbed into greater political and cultural ideology by the Great Seljuq, leading to their spread in Ancient Aleppo and Seljuq Anatolia.

The Khânaqâh al-Farafira functions as a typical Sufi khânaqâh. Cities with a dense Sufi population like Aleppo, had developed khanqahs in order to educate the people of the city and provide for a space for Sufi ritual practice. These khânaqâhs were sometimes part of larger pious complexes intended for the public which may have included a hospital, lodge, or even a kitchen. Many of these khanqahs were funded by sultans or other elite figures as a way to demonstrate their piety. This is the case for Khânaqâh al-Farafira, however, this khânaqâh in particular is noted to serve as a place to protect women in need, including the widowed, the elderly, or divorced women who needed a place to reside until they remarried. Whereas more public khânaqâhs of this era would typically have cross-axial or even straight entrances, the bent entrance of the khânaqâh al-Farafira shows parallels to private residential architecture in Aleppo during this era. This element of the architectural plan may have been intended to create privacy for sufis, especially sufi women.

== History of Khânaqâhs in Aleppo ==
At the same time that Sufism began to spread in Aleppo in the 11th century CE, khanqahs spread westward to Syria, as a result of the expansion of the Seljuk Empire. In the 13th century, state-sponsored construction of khanqahs had become widespread under the rule of the Ayyubid dynasty. Many other khanqahs were constructed in Syria, including another famous one in Aleppo that was constructed for the famous Sufi scholar Shahab al-Din Abu Hafs Umar al-Suhrawardi, who lived on the premises. Many such institutions were also built as safe spaces for women. Between 1150 CE and 1250 CE, seven khanqahs were built for women in Aleppo.

== Architecture ==
=== Entrance and portal ===
The portal of the building is located below street level, and has a rectangular doorway with a recessed limestone facade. On top of the doorway lies a rectangular stone block with an inscription panel, above this are two tiers of muqarnas decorations and a half-dome. The semi half-dome is smoothly carved, showing a six-fold geometric pattern with interlaced decorative motifs. The muqarnas tiers have an identical prominent depth and width, and execute octagonal geometry. The portal possesses no outer arch, frame, or archvault in its design. With consideration to the architectural style during the building’s founding, the semi-dome and muqarnas would more than likely have been painted.

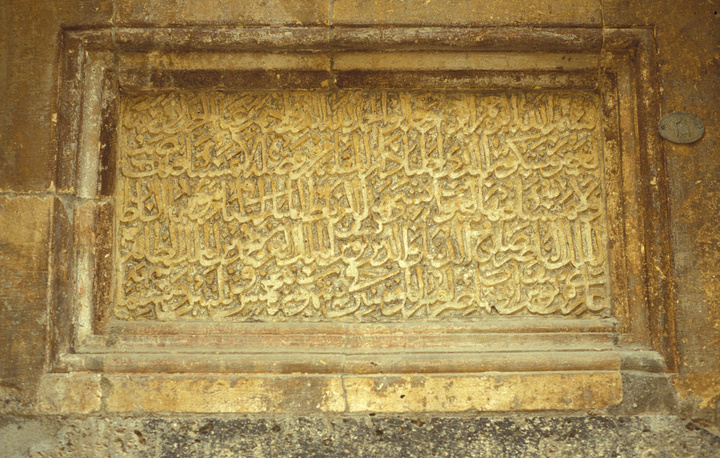
The inscription panel above the portal of the Khanqah al-Farafira: text names the building's date of creation, alongside āyāt thirty four and thirty-five of surah thirty-five of the Qur'an.

The inscription bears text from āyāt thirty-four and thirty-five of surah thirty-five of the Qur'an. It also contains the foundation text, which omits the name of the building’s patron:

Bismillāh ... "And they shall say, Praise belongs to God who has put away all sorrow from us. Surely our Lord is all-forgiving, all-thankful, who of His bounty has made us to dwell in the abode of everlasting life wherein no weariness assails us neither fatigue." [Qur'ãn: xxxv, 34–35] This blessed ribāt was built during the days of the sultan al-Malik al-Naşir Şalāḥ al-Dunyã w'al-Din Yüsuf ibn al-Malik al-‘Azīz Muhammad ibn al-Malik al-Zāhir Ghāzī ibn Yüsuf ibn Ayyüb, the defender of the Commander of the Believers, in the months of the year 635 [1237-38].

By considering historical context alongside the date of the building’s founding scholars have proposed Dayfa Khatun as the likely patron of the khânaqâh.

=== Courtyard ===
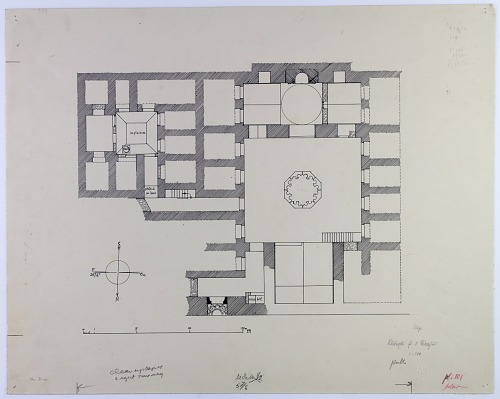
Ground plan of the Khânaqâh al-Farafira, from Ernst Herzfeld's architectural sketches, made in-between 1908-1914.

The entrance is followed by a corridor leading to the main courtyard’s northeast corner. The courtyard’s layout is rectangular with an octagonal basin in the centre. The basin’s size and complex ornamental form makes it a prominent feature. The north of the courtyard leads to a large îwân-hall while the south leads to a tripartite prayer hall with embedded niches. Laterally, both east and west sides of the courtyard lead to residential cells that occupy two floors. East of the main courtyard lies a narrow corridor that leads to a smaller courtyard surrounded with an îwân and three rooms for the visitors of the khânaqâh. The western staircase of the central courtyard leads up to the roof where multiple rooms were designated to host the sufi pilgrims and dervishes. Both east and west residential cells display a simple interior with linteled windows and doors.

=== Prayer hall and mihrab ===
On the south wall of the courtyard, the façade of the prayer hall consists of a large central doorway with a pointed arch and two smaller rectangular doorways on either side topped by arched windows. These arches are spanned at their springing by a course of stone resting on a wooden beam. The wooden beams are built into the stone of the wall on both sides of the central doorway, extending from the springing of the pointed arch on both sides to the upper point of the smaller lateral arches. This technique is repeated on both sides of the smaller arches, where the beams stretch to the eastern and western boundaries of the south facade. The central doorway possesses pivot holes at its corners that would have been used for a wooden door, pivot holes are found in the smaller doorways as well, perhaps for wooden screens. The prayer hall itself has a domed central bay and pointed barrel-vaulted lateral bays. The central bay is made entirely of brick supported on a stone collar on a transitional octagonal zone. The octagonal drum visibly holds a window in each face, and is placed on two tiers of muqarnas pendentives that have a bracket below them. The central bay also possesses a marble mihrab of a form standard during this time. Its frame is deeply molded, turning inwards at both the top and bottom of the niche, displaying fine stonemasonry. Colonettes with matching bases and capitals support the mihrab’s arch. The bases and capitals are crusader spolia. Both the niche and semidome employ inlaid stone panels in a dichromatic geometric style. The niche is ornamented by flat imitations of the base and capitals at both its top and bottom, some scholars suggest that they would have been painted to appear illusionistic. In the small loop and medallion at the top of the semidome is visible cosmatesque marblework. Rami Alafandi has noted the similarity with the Al-Shâdhbakhtîyah Madrasa mihrab.

=== Interpretation ===
Terry Allen applied his concept of the ‘Plain Style’ to describe the architectural style of the building. Allen also argues that khânaqâhs and ribāṭs embody a plan that is similar to or the same as madrasahs. In Ayubbid Architecture, he uses the building as one example among the other madrasahs, khânaqâhs, and ribāṭs of Aleppan Ayyubid architecture that exhibit the ‘relative simplicity’ of the Plain Style. Allen compares the Khanqah al-Farafira to Al-Firdaws Madrasa, another work of architecture commissioned by Dayfa Khatun. Other academics have also utilized the Al-Firdaws Madrasa to examine the style of the khânaqâh. According to Aridi, Ernst Herzfeld suggested that both the Khânaqâh-al-Farafira and the Al-Firdwas Madrasa share multiple architectural elements, a view he supports by also pointing to the shared patron and period of the two buildings’ commission.

== Later history ==
The Khânaqâh al-Farafira is one of the only khânaqâhs to survive in Aleppo and one of the only intact sufi lodges within all of Syria. Beyond Syria, it is one of the few surviving khânaqâhs in the history of Islamic architecture. During the French mandate period in Syria, the building was also used as a shelter for the Africans who were brought from their countries to serve in the French army

== Gallery ==
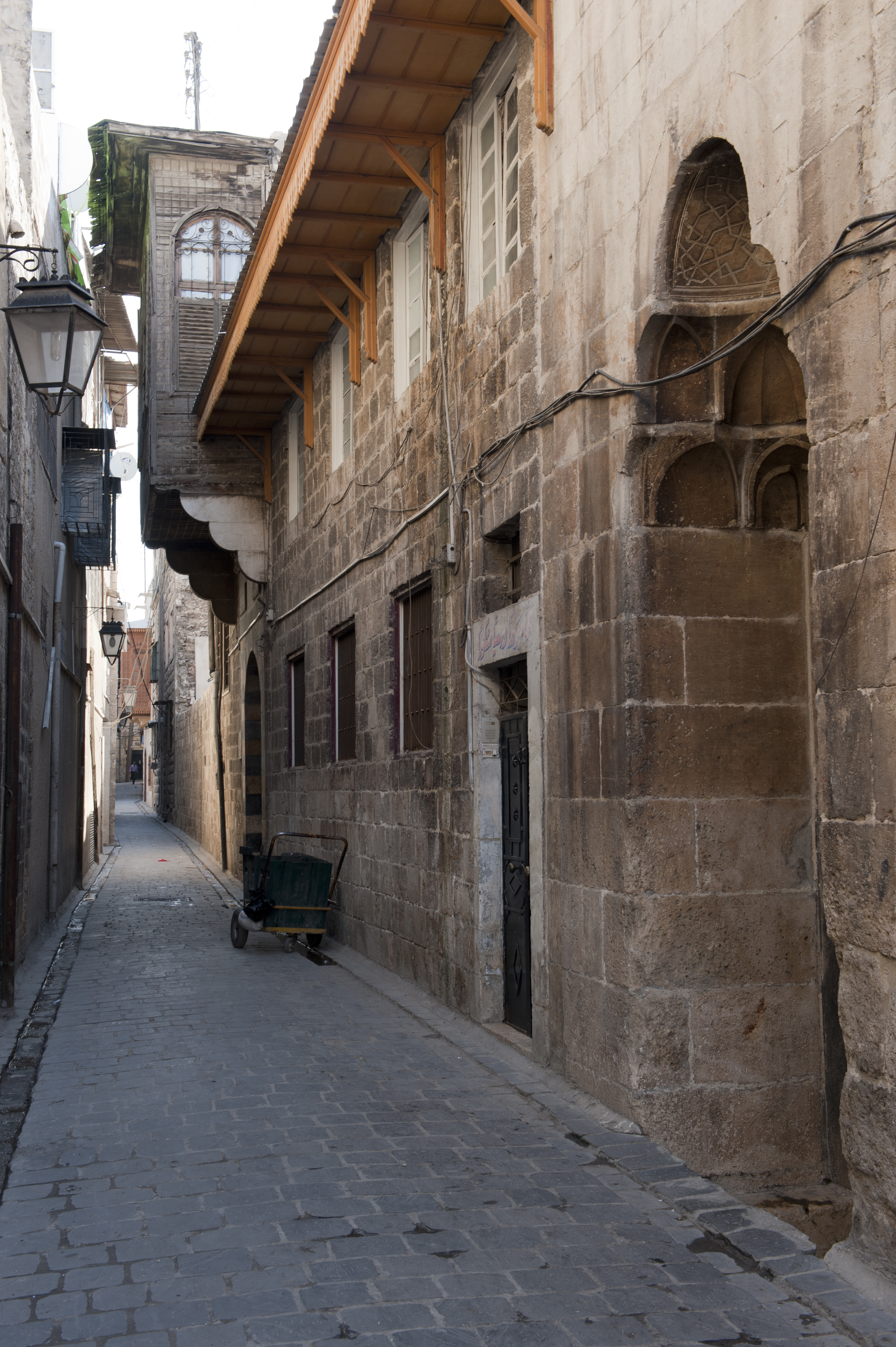
Street in the Farafira quarter leading to the entrance portal of the Khanqah al-Farafira; features traditional Islamic architecture, muqarnas, and oriental motifs.

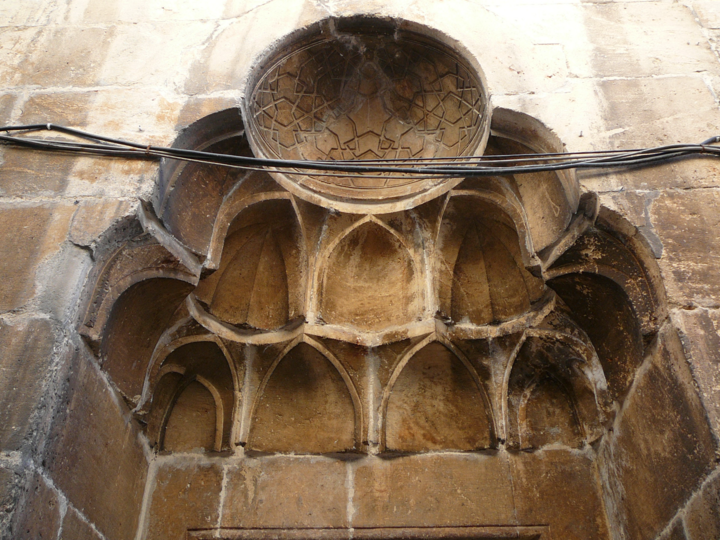
Two tiers of muqarnas decorations and a half-dome above the entrance portal to the Khânaqâh-al-Farafira; the muqarnas has octagonal geometry.

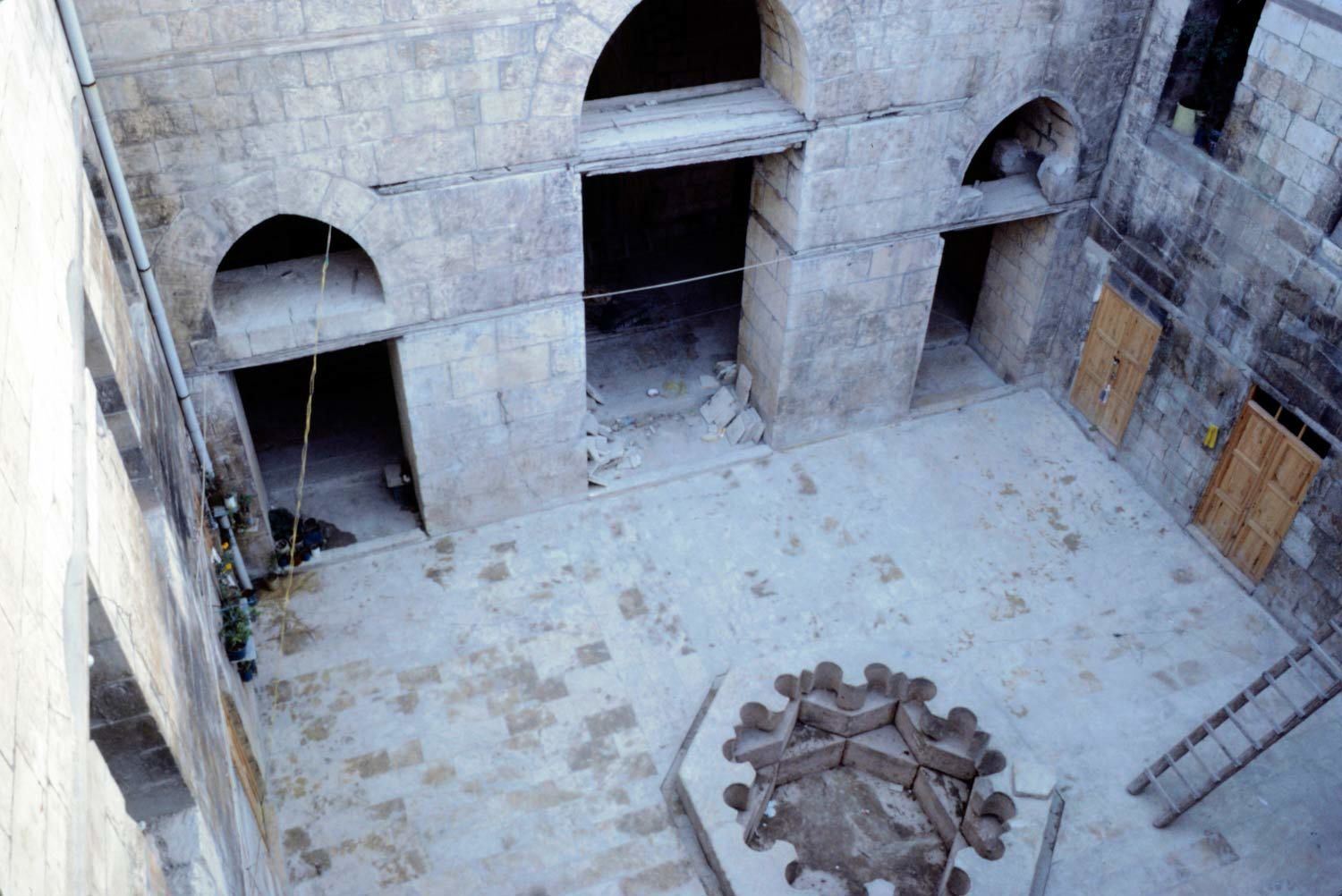
Angled view of the southside of the courtyard, including the central basin and façade of the prayer hall, with a central doorway and smaller doorways with the lintels.

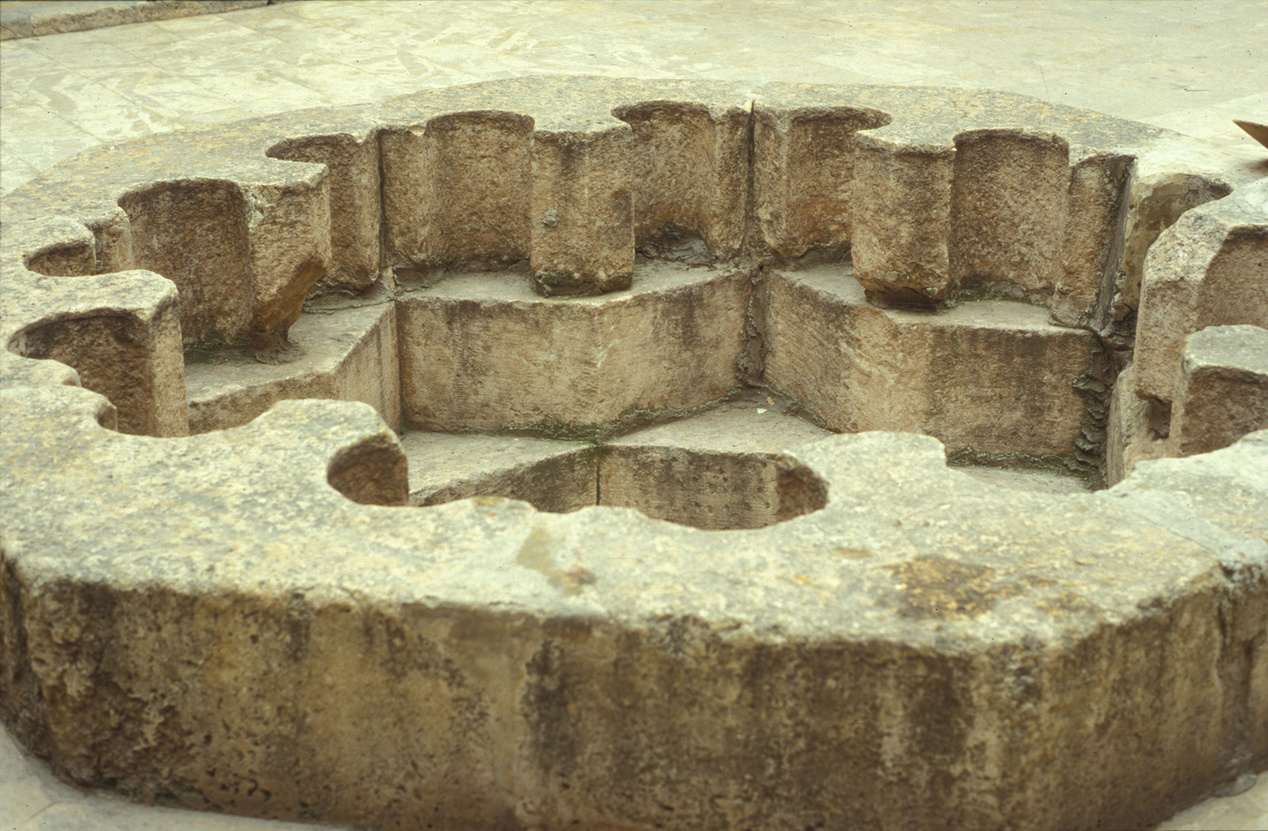
Details of water basin in the courtyard.

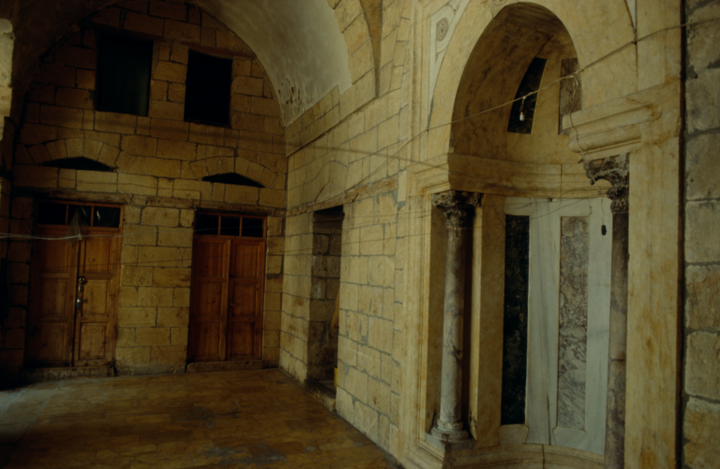
Angled view of the inside of the Prayer Hall, with a view of the mihrab.

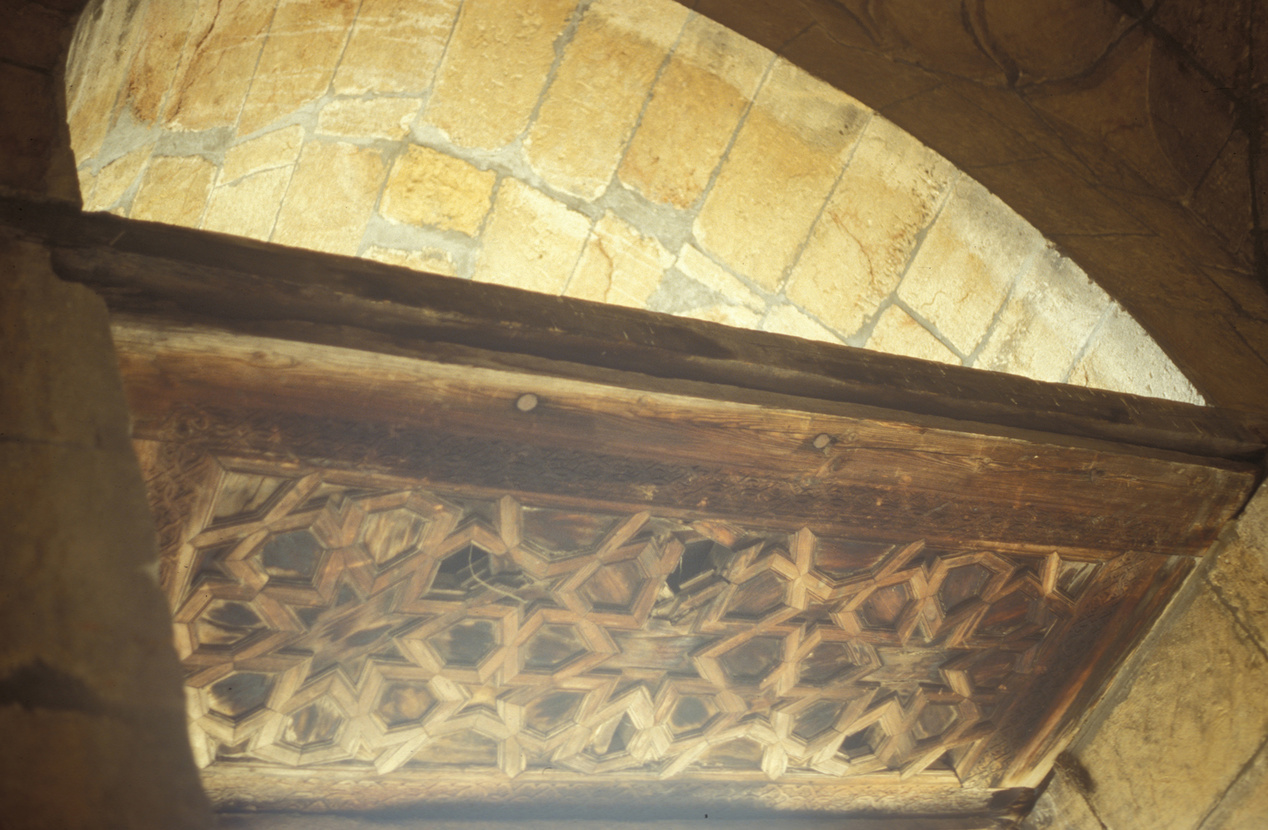
Soffit detail within the Prayer Hall.

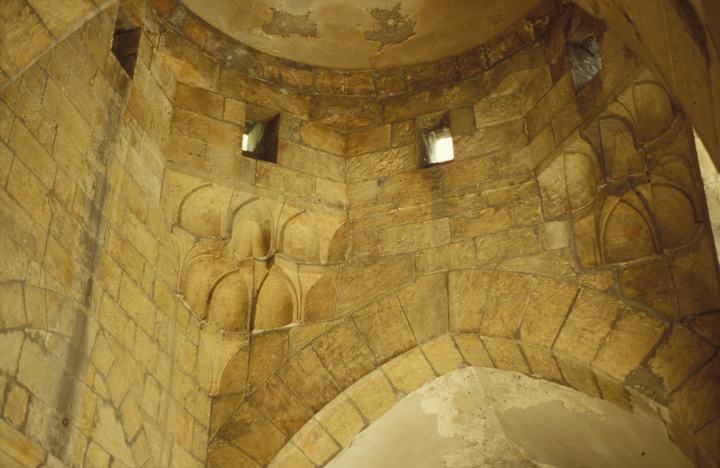
Vaulting details over the Prayer Hall and Dome.

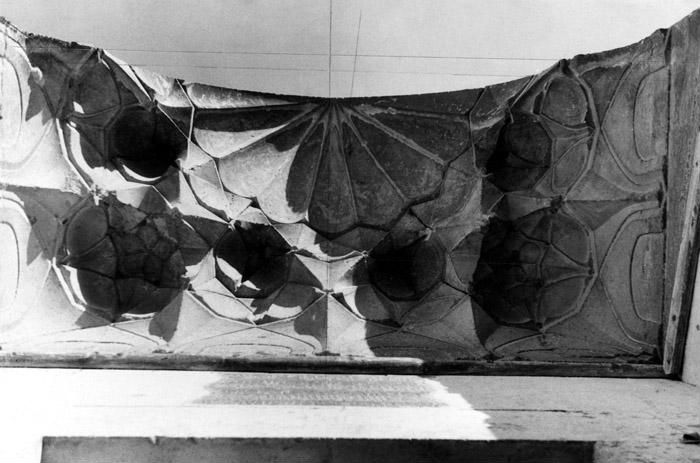
Muqarnas detailing.
