= Bab al-Hadid =

Coordinates: 36°12′12″N 37°10′01″E

- بَاب الْحَدِيْد
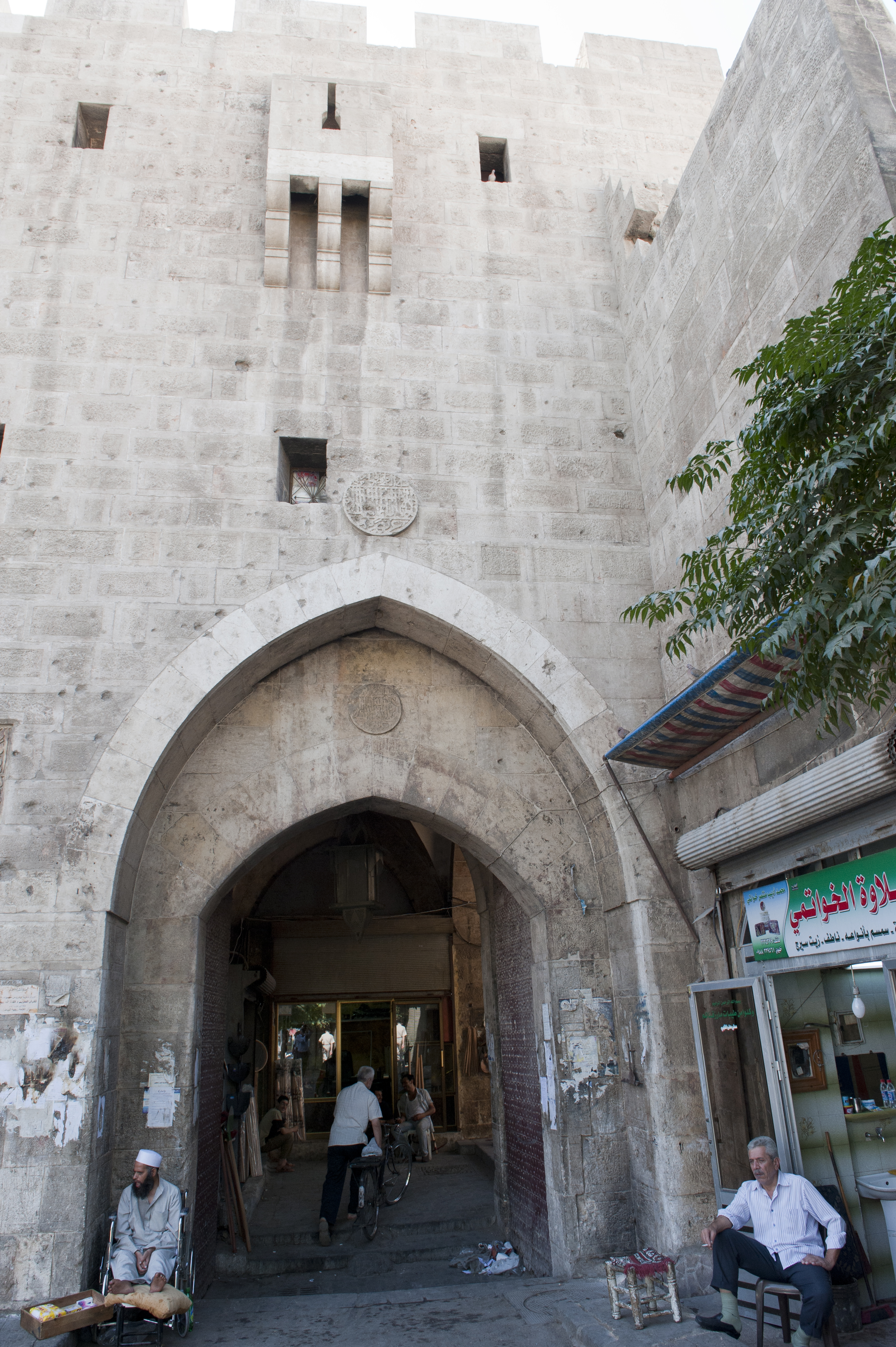
- Bab al-Hadid in 2010
- Interactive map of the Bab al-Hadid area
- Alternative names: Iron Gate of Victory

General information
- Status: restored
- Type: City gate
- Architectural style: Islamic architecture
- Location: Aleppo, Syria
- Completed: between 1216 and 1236
- Renovated: 1509, 2020-21
- Owner: Az-Zahir Ghazi, Al-Aziz Muhammad

Design and construction
- Known for: One of the 9 main gates of the ancient city walls of Aleppo

Bab al-Hadid (Arabic: بَاب الْحَدِيْد, romanized: Bāb al-Ḥadīd) meaning Iron Gate, also known as the Iron Gate Victory, is one of the nine historical gates of the Ancient City of Aleppo, Syria. It is one of the well-preserved gates of old Aleppo.

== History ==
The gate was planned during the reign of Az-Zahir Ghazi and built by his son Mohammed as Bab al-Qanat (the Aqueduct Gate). It was rebuilt by the final Mamluk sultan Al-Ashraf Qansuh al-Ghawri in 1509.

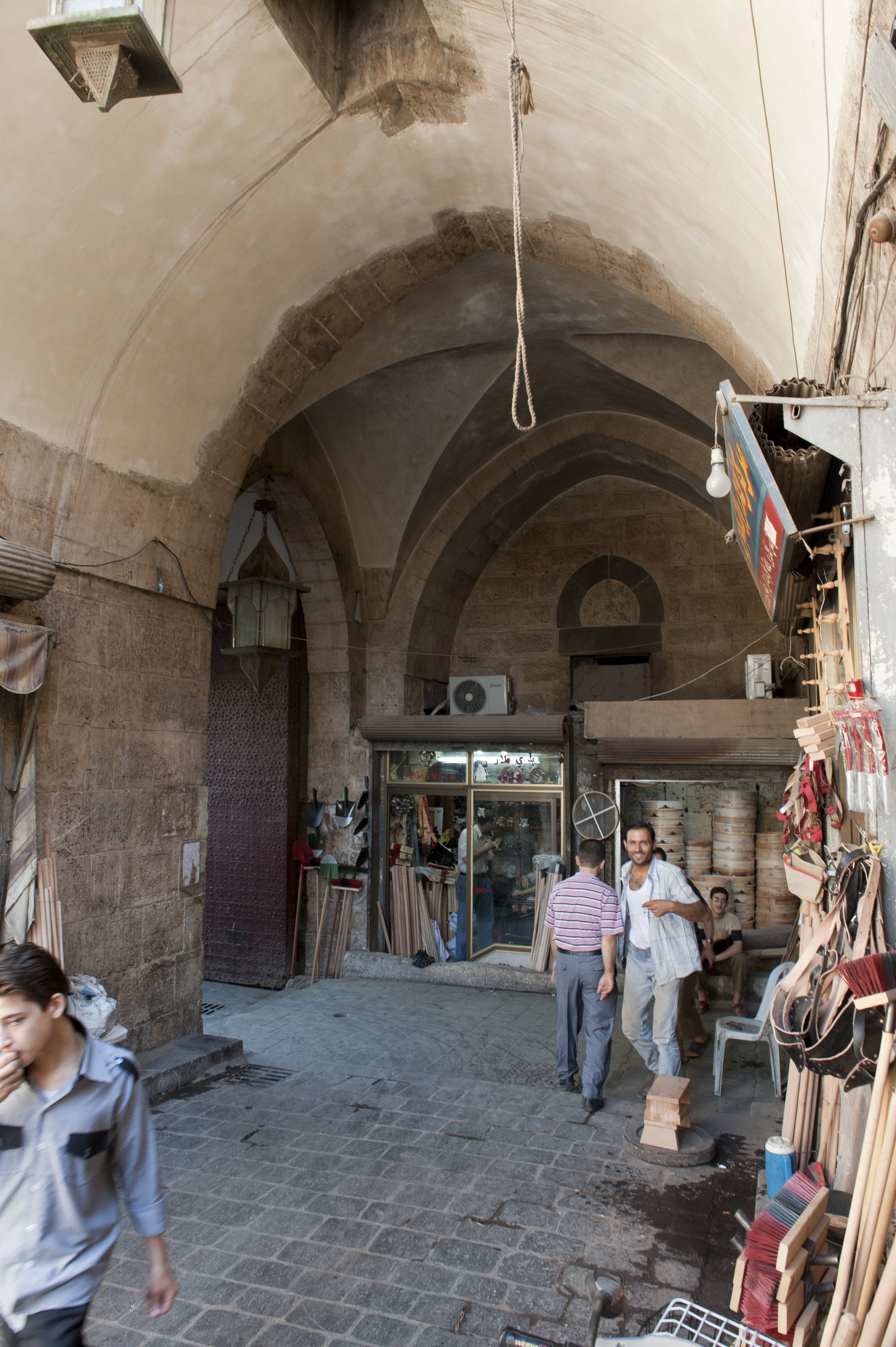
Inside a two-storeyed bastion Bab al-Hadid

The gate and surrounding quarters of the old city are some of the best preserved areas in the old city of Aleppo. It was historically known for its blacksmiths and to this day, there are some operating with the same traditional practices, most of whom have had the trade in their family for many generations.

Restoration of the damaged gate began in September 2020 and was completed in 2021.
