= Shams al-Din Lu'lu' al-Amini =

Regent and chief advisor of al-Nasir Yusuf

Shams al-Dīn Luʾluʾ al-Amīnī (died 3 February 1251) was one of the regents of Aleppo for the Ayyūbid ruler al-Nāṣir Yūsuf and later his chief advisor and the commander-in-chief of his armies. He dominated the government of al-Nāṣir from 1242 until his death.

== Early life and regency ==
Shams al-Dīn Luʾluʾ was a native of Mosul of Armenian origin. He was a freedman (ʿatīq) of Amīn al-Dīn Yumn, who was in turn a freedman of Nūr al-Dīn Arslān Shāh ibn Masʿūd, ruler of Mosul. In 1225 or 1226, he invited his fellow Mosul native, Ibn Bāṭīsh, back to Aleppo, where the latter had previously lived in 1205–1206 and 1223. According to Ibn al-ʿAdīm's biographical dictionary of Aleppo, Ibn Bāṭīsh lived with Shams al-Dīn, who relied on his advice in conducting his affairs. According to ʿIzz al-Dīn ibn Shaddād, Shams al-Dīn founded a school in Aleppo.

By 1236, Shams al-Dīn held the rank of emir. In that year, he was one of two emirs appointed to the four-man regency council for the seven-year-old al-Nāṣir, the other being ʿIzz al-Dīn ʿUmar ibn Mujallī. The vizier Ibn al-Qifṭī also sat on the council, while actual power was exercised by the child's grandmother, Ḍayfa Khātūn, who was represented on the council by Jamāl al-Dawla Iqbāl al-Khātūnī. The regency formally ended with her death in 1242, but, as the ruler was still a child, Shams al-Dīn was the de facto head of government in Aleppo. He remained throughout his life the commander-in-chief of the Aleppan army. Towards the end, however, he was distrusted by the Turkic mamlūks (slave soldiers) of the elite ʿAzīziyya and Nāṣiriyya contingents.

== Commander-in-chief and chief advisor ==
In May 1246, Shams al-Dīn, in alliance with Emir al-Manṣūr of Homs, led the army of Aleppo against the Khwarāzmians. Because of his greater experience with the Khwarāzmians, al-Manṣūr took command of the combined army and on 18 May crushed the Khwarāzmian power in Syria permanently in a battle near the Lake of Homs. The head of the Khwarāzmian leader, Baraka Ḵhān, was given to Shams al-Dīn, who had it hung from the gate of the citadel in Aleppo.

In 1248, Shams al-Dīn convinced al-Nāṣir Yūsuf to annex Homs, then ruled by al-Ashraf Mūsā, to prevent it from forming a potent alliance with al-Ṣāliḥ Najm al-Dīn Ayyūb of Egypt. He led the army himself that successfully besieged Homs from May to August 1248. The Egyptian siege that soon followed, led by Fakhr al-Dīn ibn al-Shaykh, was broken off at the insistence of the ʿAbbāsid caliph, al-Mustaʿṣim, and because of the impending Seventh Crusade. As a result, Egypt recognized al-Nāṣir as ruler of Homs.

Shams al-Dīn moved with al-Nāṣir to Damascus after its conquest in 1250. He urged al-Nāṣir to send an embassy to Karakorum to make formal submission to Mongke, Great Khan of the Mongols. Ultimately, Zayn al-Dīn al-Ḥāfiẓī was sent in 1250 and returned with formal recognition of al-Nāṣir's position from the Great Khan.

Following the mamlūk uprising in Egypt, Shams al-Dīn urged al-Nāṣir to re-conquer Egypt for the dynasty. Ibn Wāṣil records that his own mamlūks had begun to favour their Turkic co-ethnics in Egypt. During the invasion of Egypt, he was captured at the battle of Kurāʿ on 3 February 1251. Despite the entreaties of Ḥusām al-Dīn ibn Abī ʿĀlī, who believed the captive was a valuable hostage, the Mamlūk ruler, Quṭb al-Dīn Aybak, ordered Shams al-Dīn executed. Ibn Wāṣil blames his defeat and capture on his own "mismanagement", but admits that had he "not been killed ... he would have entered Cairo" at the head of the other commanders such as al-Muʿaẓẓam Tūrānshāh ibn Ṣalāḥ al-Dīn, who were actually brought to Cairo as captives.

The death of his "guiding spirit" and "chief advisor" was a major blow to al-Nāṣir, whose reign never again saw the succession of triumphs that had characterized it under Shams al-Dīn.

== Bibliography ==
- Eddé, Anne-Marie (1997). "Kurdes et Tures dans l'armee ayyoubide de Syrie du Nord". In Ya'acov Lev (ed.). War and Society in the Eastern Mediterranean, 7th–15th Centuries. E. J. Brill. pp. 225–236.
- Humphreys, R. Stephen (1977). From Saladin to the Mongols: The Ayyubids of Damascus, 1193–1260. State University of New York Press.
- Jackson, Peter, ed. (2007). The Seventh Crusade, 1244–1254: Sources and Documents. Ashgate.
- Morray, David W. (1994). An Ayyubid Notable and his World: Ibn al-ʿAdīm and Aleppo as Portrayed in his Biographical Dictionary of People Associated with the City. E. J. Brill.
