= Ibn Batish =

Muslim scholar and jurist

Ibn Bāṭīsh (June 1179 – June 1257) was a Muslim scholar and jurist belonging to the Shāfiʿī maddhab (legal school of thought). He was the muftī of Aleppo from 1230 until his death.

== Life ==
Ibn Bāṭīsh, (Note: His full name as he himself gives it is Abū al-Majd Ismāʿīl ibn Abī al-Barakāt Hibatallāh Abū al-Riḍā Saʿīd ibn Hibatallāh ibn Muḥammad ibn Hibatallāh ibn Muḥammad al-Mawṣilī al-Faqīh al-Shāfiʿī. It is often given in reduced form: Ibn Bāṭīsh al-Mawṣilī, Imād al-Dīn Abū l-Majd Ismāʿīl ibn Hibatallāh ibn Saʿīd ibn Bāṭīsh, or Abū Majd Ismāʿīl ibn Hibatallāh al-Mawṣilī al-Shāfiʿī Ibn Bāṭīsh. The meaning of the kunya Ibn Bāṭīsh is unknown and he himself did not use it. Medieval authors disagree as to whether it was a nickname or a part of his family name, i.e., "descendant of Bāṭīsh". The author al-Dimyāṭī refers to Ibn Bāṭīsh's brother as Ibn Bāṭīsh also, implying that their father was named (or nicknamed) Bāṭīsh.) whose given name was Ismāʿīl, was born on 24 June 1179 (Note: Ibn Shaʿʿār and Ibn al-ʿAdīm independently agree on the date, but al-Yūnīnī gives 14 June 1179.) in Mosul (as the nisba al-Mawṣilī indicates) to a humble family. His father, Hibatallāh, had moved to Mosul from al-Ḥadītha. Ibn Bāṭīsh records two things he learned from his father: a ḥadīth (tradition) his father had learned from al-Shahrazūrī and some poetry of Laylā al-Akhyaliyya and her lover that his father learned from al-Ṭūsī, who taught at Mosul and died in 1182. The only other family member about whom anything is known is Ibn Batish's younger brother Ibrāhīm, who was born in Mosul on 16 March 1189 and died during the siege of Aleppo in January 1260, according to al-Dimyāṭī.

Ibn Bāṭīsh excelled in fiqh (jurisprudence) at the Madrasa al-Niẓāmīyyah of Baghdad. He also studied adab (belles-lettres) and ḥadīth (Islamic traditions). He returned to Mosul and served the Madrasa al-Badriyya as a muʿīd (repetitor).

Ibn Bāṭīsh visited Aleppo in 1205 or 1206 and met the shaykh Abū Hāshim al-Hāshimī. (Note: This may have been his first visit, or he may have studied there earlier.) He returned in November or December 1223 on business with Kamāl al-Dīn ibn Muhājir, who accompanied him as far as Raqqa. On this occasion in Aleppo, the historian Ibn al-ʿAdīm copied some of his poetry. He returned to Mosul before being invited back to Aleppo in 1225 or 1226 by Shams al-Dīn Luʾluʾ al-Amīnī, a fellow native of Mosul. He remained in Aleppo for the rest of his life, living with Shams al-Dīn, who relied heavily on his advice and was, after 1236, one of the most powerful people in Aleppo until his death in 1251.

In 1230, Ibn Bāṭīsh was appointed to teaching and research at the Madrasa al-Niffariyya al-Nūriyya in Aleppo by the chief qāḍī (judge) Bahāʾ al-Dīn ibn Shaddād. He was thus the muftī and sole source of legal rulings (fatwā) in Aleppo until his death.

Ibn Bāṭīsh died between 16 and 25 June 1257. He was eighty Islamic years old. In his Tārīkh al-khulafāʾ (History of the Caliphs), al-Suyūṭī lists him as "one of the most eminent of the" Shāfiʿīs who died in the reign of Caliph al-Mustaʿṣim. Ibn Bāṭīsh has entries in Ibn Khallikān's (Note: Ibn Khallikān was one of his students.) Wafayāt and in Ibn al-ʿAdīm's biographical dictionary of Aleppo. The most complete list of his writings is found in the ʿUqūd al-Jumān of Ibn Shaʿʿār. A list of his teachers is provided by al-Ḥusaynī.

== Works ==
Ibn Bāṭīsh's known works, all in Arabic, include:

- Ṭabaqāt aṣḥāb al-Shāfiʿī, (Note: This work is known y several different titles. Ṭabaqāt aṣḥāb al-Shāfiʿī is the form of the title given in al-Ṣafadī. The work is described but not titled in Ibn al-ʿAdīm. The title also appears as Ṭabaqāt al-shāfiʿīya and Ṭabaqāt al-fuqahāʾ al-Shāfiʿiyya.) a ṭabaqāt (chronological biographical dictionary) of the Shāfiʿī maddhab
- Mushtabih al-nisba, a lost work on easily confused nisbas
- Nukhba min mushtabih al-nisba, a condensed version of the Mushtabih, surviving in a single damaged manuscript
- Mughnī fī al-inbāʾ ʿan gharīb al-muhadhdhab wal-asmāʾ, an "explanation of the difficulties found in the Muhaddab of Abū Isḥāq al-Shīrāzī"
- Ghayāt al-Wasāʾil Ilā Maʿrifat al-Awāʾil
- Tamyīz wal-faṣl bayn al-muttafiq fī al-khaṭṭ wal-naqṭ wal-shakl, a five-volume work only the last two volumes of which are extant. It is a biographical dictionary arranged by nisba.
- Sharb al-Tanbīh, a lost commentary on the Tanbīh of Abū Isḥāq al-Shīrāzī
- Muzīl al-irtiyāb ʿan mushtabih al-intisāb, a lost work, possibly on geography or biographies organized by nisba
- Fayṣal fī mushtabih asmāʾ al-buldān, a lost geographical treatise
- a commentary on the work of Abū Isḥāq al-Fayrūzabādī, title unknown.

The Ṭabaqāt was used as a source by al-Asnawī, al-Subkī and Ibn Qāḍī Shuhba. It is as yet unpublished.

== Works cited ==
- Böwering, Gerhard; Orfali, Bilal, eds. (2013). The Comfort of the Mystics: A Manual and Anthology of Early Sufism. Brill.
- Jalalu'ddin a's Suyuti (1881). History of the Caliphs. Translated by H. S. Jarrett. Calcutta.
- Mac Guckin de Slane, William, ed. (1842). Ibn Khallikan's Biographical Dictionary. Vol. 1. Paris.
- al-Māniʿ, ʿAbd al-ʿAzīz b. Nāṣir [in Arabic] (1976). An Edition of Ghayāt al-Wasāʾil Ilā Maʿrifat al-Awāʾil by Ismāʿīl b. Hibat Allāh al-Mawṣilī, Known as Ibn Bāṭīsh (575–655/1179–1257) (PhD diss.). University of Exeter. Archived from the original on 2022-04-26.
- Morray, David W. (1994). An Ayyubid Notable and his World: Ibn al-ʿAdīm and Aleppo as Portrayed in his Biographical Dictionary of People Associated with the City. Brill.
