= Dayfa Khatun =

Ayyubid emir of Aleppo from 1236 to 1242

Regent of the Ayyubid Emirate of Aleppo
- Regency: 26 November 1236 – 1242
- Predecessor: Shihab ad-Din Toghril
- Successor: Shams ad-Din Lu'lu'
- Emir: An-Nasir Yusuf (grandson)
- Died: 1242
- Spouse: Az-Zahir Ghazi, Emir of Aleppo (m. 1212; d. 1216),
- Issue: Al-Aziz Muhammad
- Dynasty: Ayyubid
- Father: Al-Adil, Sultan of Egypt
- Religion: Sunni Islam

Dayfa Khatun (Arabic: ضيفة خاتون; died 1242) was a Kurdish Ayyubid princess, and the regent of Aleppo from 26 November 1236 to 1242, during the minority of her grandson An-Nasir Yusuf. She was an Ayyubid princess, as the daughter of Al-Adil, Sultan of Egypt. She married her first cousin, Az-Zahir Ghazi, Emir of Aleppo, which marked the end of the rivalry between the two branches of the family.

During her minor grandson's reign, Khatun achieved an unprecedented measure of autonomous political influence. She acted as regent during the minority of her grandson, which was a highly unusual position for a woman in an Islamic dynasty, and played a major role in architectural patronage in Aleppo, being responsible for the construction of the Firdaws Madrasa.

== Marriage ==
Khatun was born to a Kurdish Muslim family. She was married to Saladin's son Az-Zahir Ghazi in 1212. Ghazi requested her hand in marriage to end the conflict between him and al-Adil. When she arrived in Aleppo, she was greeted by a great ceremony and received by Ghazi, his emirs, and local notables. Ibn Wasil wrote, "When she entered al-Malik az-Zahir [Az-Zahir Ghazi], he arose and took several steps towards her and showed her great respect." Her marriage was instrumental in the unification and maintenance of the Ayyubid empire."

This marriage also allowed Khatun's status to be elevated as a female member of the Ayyubid court, while also enjoying the protection provided by her and her husband’s prestigious families.

Khatun's status as an important lady of the court solidified when she gave birth to a son and future heir to the throne of Aleppo, al-Aziz Muhammad. The birth of her son was significant because it acted as the ultimate seal of status for Khatun as mother of a sultan. When her husband died in 1216, Aleppo was passed on to al-Aziz Muhammad and his atabek, Shihab al-Din Toghril, who ruled until his son was of age in 1231. Ghazi’s son only ruled for 4 years until 1235, when both he and Toghril died, leaving Khatun to become the first woman to govern an Islamic dynasty.

Not much about her is recorded for the remainder of Ghazi's rule which ended when he died in 1216 or Muhammad's reign which ended when he died in 1236. Khatun is famous for building the Khanqah al-Farafira, the monastic centre of sufism in the city of Aleppo.

=== Arrival in Aleppo ===
It was not unusual for Ayyubid (and their precedents, Zangid) princesses to have public influence. The noblewomen of this dynasty “commanded a status rarely accorded to court women before them.” Ayyubid princesses often went on processions to Friday prayer, accompanied by servants, and completely obscured from commoners. This was meant to display the righteousness and piety of the women of the court. In 1232 (629), the sultan of Egypt al-Malik went to claim the Anatolian fort of Amida (Diyarbakr). Fatima Khatun, wife of Dayfa Khatun’s son Muhammad accompanied the sultan. Fatima was received by Aleppan dignitaries, one of which was Dayfa Khatun whose warm ceremonious welcome also displayed her gentleness and piety.

== Regency ==
With the death of her son, Khatun came to play a prominent role. Her grandson An-Nasir Yusuf was only seven years old, so a council of regency was formed, consisting of Shams ad-Din Lu'lu' al-Amini, Izz ad-Din Umar al-Majalli, the vizier Jamal ad-Din al-Qifti and her own slave Jamal ad-Dawla Iqbal az-Zahiri. The latter acted as her secretary and deputy to the regency council.

Khatun had the position of regent, which was very unusual in an Islamic dynasty. All decisions of the regency council had to be approved by her, and her signature was affixed to all documents it issued. Although Dayfa Khatun was absent from the council and allowed these men to agree on the matters, she was aware of all the details and without her approval the council's decisions were worthless. Ibn Wasil recorded that "she had the final say on all state affairs, and she put her alama [insignia] on all documents and correspondence".

During her regency Aleppo was threatened from many directions by powerful neighbours, but contemporary writer all attest to her diplomatic skills in keeping Aleppo free from conflict. After her death, Aleppo's diplomatic position was never as strong vis a vis its neighbours as it was under her rule.

=== War and diplomacy ===
The period of her regency coincided with the conflict between her brothers Al-Kamil in Egypt and Al-Ashraf in Damascus. In 1237 Al-Ashraf persuaded most of the Ayyubid rulers in Syria to join a coalition against Al-Kamil, the object of which was to confine him to Egypt and assure the continued autonomy of their Emirates. However that same year Al-Ashraf died unexpectedly and although Dayfa Khatun and several other rulers renewed it under the leadership of another brother, as-Salih Ismail, the coalition was weakened by the defection of some emirates to Al-Kamil. Al Kamil sent an army into Syria and took Damascus. He intended to embark on the pacification of all the other emirates in Syria, including Aleppo, but they were spared by his death in March 1238 (Rajab 635) shortly after he took Damascus.

After this Khatun was careful to keep Aleppo out of the fratricidal wars which were the norm among the Ayyubids, turning down proposals for alliance from al-Jawad Yunus, the new ruler of Damascus, who wanted to revive the anti-Egyptian coalition, and later from As-Salih Ismail, who succeeded him. In 1240, she was able to use her neutrality in these conflicts to broker a formal declaration from the Sultan as-Salih Ayyub in Egypt, which committed the Sultan to respecting Aleppo's independence.

In 1240 new threat to Aleppo emerged in the shape of the Khwarezmians who had allied themselves with as-Salih Ayyub and whom he had settled to the east of Aleppo in Diyar Mudar. For reasons which are not clear, a large Khwarezmian army of around 12,000 men crossed the Euphrates and threatened Aleppo. A small Aleppan force of 1,500 cavalry led by Al-Muazzam Turanshah was defeated in November 1240 (Rabi' II) and the city lay exposed. A large force came up from Homs and deterred the Khwarezmians from attacking. They withdrew back across the Euphrates. In early 1241 they attacked again, but the army of al-Mansur Ibrahim of Homs once defeated them decisively, and thereafter the forces of Homs and Aleppo took control of all of as-Salih Ayyub's territories in the Jazira with the exception of Hasankeyf. As-Salih Ayyub was too preoccupied with affairs in Egypt to be able to respond.

== Patronage ==
Khatun was born in the city of Damascus. Saladin’s conquest of the city kicked off an 85-year period of “intense and sustained” patronage by women until the 1260 Mongol invasion. Khatun, likely, had always intended to be a court patron considering female patrons were a tradition of Damascus by the time she was born.

“Architectural patronage of women in Damascus surpassed that in Aleppo during the twelfth century, although the rise of Dayfa Khatun and the foundation of the madrasa al- Firdaws in the first half of the thirteenth century seems to have reversed this situation.”

As ruler of Aleppo, Khatun exercised her power by dedicating her efforts to civic affairs and the patronage of scholars and mystics. She sponsored two major architectural structures, the Khanqah al-Farafra and the Madrasa al-firdaws. Both were privileged locations and thus especially desirable for pious foundations: the former was the residential quarter of the city's notables; the latter already contained several other Ayyubid madrasas and mausoleums. This practice was very common for court women of the Ayyubid dynasty to found mausoleums, khanqahs, and madrasas in order to promote religious learning and as a means for enhancing their prestige and commemorating their names.

Ibn Wasil wrote, "She was just to her subjects, very charitable and loving towards them. She removed various taxes in all the regions of Aleppo. She favored jurists, ascetics, scholars, and people of religion, and extended to them many charities.” This testimony is confirmed by Khatun's architectural patronage, which perpetuated her Sufic beliefs.

Sufism was a politically intelligent choice for a ruler of Aleppo to support. When Saladin conquered Aleppo, one his first decrees required non-Muslims in Aleppo to distinguish themselves through sartorial laws. Scholars argue that this was an attempt “to reconcile Shi’ites and Sunnis to Ayyubid rule” while promoting a sense of equality between the two sects (Shi’ism and Sunnism) by a shared Muslim identity and shared difference from the non-Muslims. Aleppo was prone to sectarian violence. Sufism, however, emphasizes individual spirituality, female participation, and non-political Islam.

=== The Khanqah al-Farafra ===
The Khanqah al-Farafira, or as it was originally known, the ar-Ribat al-Nasir, was a space specifically created for female Sufic ascetics. This specific khanqah is important because it was intended as a place of residence for elderly, divorced, or widowed women who had no other place to go until their death or remarriage. Dayfa’s adoption of Sufism during this time was also important as it offered women possibilities for participation in their religious and social lives as well as leadership positions. This is the only surviving khanqah in Aleppo and perhaps, all of Syria, a testament to the high quality of materials she used.

=== The al-Firdaws Madrasa ===
The al-Firdaws Madrasa, also referred to as the School of Paradise, is a 13th century complex that Khatun established with her own personal resources. The complex consists of a madrasa, mausoleum, as well as other multi functional spaces. The mausoleum in particular was meant to house the bodies of the queen and her family which upheld traditional Ayyubid architectural standards of being located at a raised site with no dirty water or waste nearby. The madrasa was not only a school or a monumental tomb, it also advanced the science and knowledge of grave preservation-which was very important in Islamic culture. Specifically, the madrasa’s tombs assisted in averting the degradation of the graves. The madrasa functioned as a religious school, one that saw gaining religious knowledge as a good moral action in the eyes of Ayyubid teaching traditions. An inscription carved into the side of the al-Firdaws Madrasa translates as, ”this is what has ordered its construction: the elevated curtain and impregnable veil, the merciful queen…Dayfa Khatun, daughter of the sultan al-Malik al-Aldil…".This inscription uses some of the earliest feminine honorifics and royal epithets known, further solidifying Khatun’s power as a queen and a prominent female patron.

=== Legacy ===
Despite the significance of these structures to the city of Aleppo during her reign, they were outside of the citadel walls. To be the patron of a monument inside the citadel indicated one’s extreme importance to the royal family. Toghril was the atabek of Muhammad, and the chosen successor of al-Zahir until Muhammad was of ruling age. His value to the royal family is represented in an intramural madrasa he commissioned. However, hardly any female patron had her buildings erected in the citadel, not even Dayfa.

== Contemporaries ==
=== Safwat al-Mulk ===
Safwat al-Mulk was a Seljuk princess who most notably created a funerary cupola for her and her son in the early 12th century. This cupola was part of a larger compound west of Damascus that housed a mosque and Sufi hospice. Much like Dayfa Khatun, Safwat al-Mulk’s patronage centered around religion and Sufism, as was the norm for women patrons of the day.

=== Zumurrud ===
Zumurrud was a former slave that rose to prominence due to her marriage to al-Mustadī. Zumurrud was equally active in politics and patronage compared to Dayfa Khatun, as Zumurrud sponsored many madrasas, ribats, and mosques during her life. One of her main works, the Madrasa Khatuniyya, was built in 1132 west of Damascus, in a close proximity to Safwat al-Mulk’s own contributions to the architectural landscape of Damascus. This madrasa was only the fifth madrasa ever built in Damascus, showing that important architectural projects were not relegated away from women patrons.

== Death ==
Khatun died in 1242 (640) and the leading figure in the regency thereafter was Shams al-Din Lu'lu' until her grandson An-Nasir Yusuf began to rule independently.

Female patrons and leaders were revered and respected during the time of Khatun; for example, after Zumurrud Khatun’s death mourning continued for an entire year. Her possessions were carefully distributed, and many elegies were created in her honor during this time period, per the request of the caliph. Looking at the amount of patronage by women in the 12th century and accounts on how people felt about these powerful women, this was a time when women had growing influence and established a place in the architectural and political sphere in the Middle East.

== Bibliography ==
- Humphreys, R. S., 1977, From Saladin to the Mongols, The Ayyubids of Damascus 1183-1260, SUNY Press
- Humphreys, R. S., 1999, Between Memory and Desire: The Middle East in a Troubled Age, University of California Press
- Ruggles, D. F., 2000, ed., Women, Patronage, and Self-Representation in Islamic Societies, SUNY Press,
- Hammad, M. (2005, January). Madrasat al Firdaws: Paradis ayyûbide de Dayfat Khâtûn Alep (Syrie) 633 A.H. = 1236 E.C. (dissertation). ResearchGate. Ecole Spéciale d'Architecture. Retrieved September 14, 2021, from https://www.researchgate.net/publication/272720436_Madrasat_al_Firdaws.
- Shaikh, Z. (n.d.). Ayyubid Aleppo: 1178 – 1260 (dissertation). AlFaheez. Zainab Shaikh. Retrieved September 15, 2021, from http://alhafeez.net/Books/Ayyubid_Aleppo.pdf.
- Humphreys, R. S. (1994). Women as Patrons of Religious Architecture in Ayyubid Damascus. Muqarnas, 11, 35–54. https://doi.org/10.2307/1523208
- Tabbaa, Y. (1997). The City: Aleppo Under the Ayyubids . In Constructions of power and piety in medieval Aleppo (whole book). essay, Pennsylvania State University Press.
