= Al-Qifti =

13th century Egyptian historian and biographer

- القفطي
- Born: Jamāl al-Dīn Abū al-Ḥasan 'Alī ibn Yūsuf ibn Ibrāhīm ibn 'Abd al-Wahid al-Shaybānī c. 1172; Qift, Upper Egypt
- Died: 1248 (aged 75–76); Aleppo, Syria
- Occupations: Historian, Biographer, Encyclopedist, Administrator
- Employer: Ayyubid rulers of Aleppo
- Title: Vizier
- Parent: Yūsuf al-Qifṭī (father)

Academic work
- Era: Ayyubid period
- Notable works: Kitāb Ikhbār al-'Ulamā' bi Akhbār al-Ḥukamā (History of Learned Men)

Jamāl al-Dīn Abū al-Ḥasan 'Alī ibn Yūsuf ibn Ibrāhīm ibn 'Abd al-Wahid al-Shaybānī (جمال الدين أبو الحسن علي بن يوسف بن ٳبراهي بن عبد الواحد الشيباني), called al-Qifṭī (القفطي; c. 1172 – 1248), was an Egyptian Arab historian, biographer, encyclopedist and administrator under the Ayyubid rulers of Aleppo. His biographical dictionary Kitāb Ikhbār al-'Ulamā' bi Akhbār al-Ḥukamā (إخبار العلماء بأخبار الحكماء, tr. 'History of Learned Men') is an important source of Islamic biography. Much of his vast literary output is lost, including his histories of the Seljuks, Buyids and the Maghreb, and biographical dictionaries of philosophers and philologists.

== Life ==
'Alī al-Qifṭī, known as Ibn al-Qifṭī, was a native of Qift, Upper Egypt, the son of al-Qāḍī al-Ashraf, Yūsuf al-Qifṭī (b.548/1153), and the grandson of Ibrāhīm ibn 'Abd al-Wāḥid, al-Qāḍī al-Awḥad in the Ayyūbid court. Alī succeeded his father and grandfather into court administration but displayed scholarly inclinations. When the family left Qift in 1177, following the rising of a Fāṭimid Pretender, his father, Yūsuf, took up official posts in Upper Egypt and 'Alī completed his early education in Cairo.

In 583/1187 Yūsuf al-Qifṭī was appointed deputy to al-Qāḍī al-Fāḍil, chancellor and adviser to Ṣalāh al-Dīn at Jerusalem, and patron and benefactor of Maimonides, Al-Qifṭī spent many years studying and collecting material for his later works. When Ṣalāh al-Dīn died in 598/1201 and his brother, Malik al-'Ādil, usurped his nephew's position to occupy Jerusalem, Ibn al-Qifṭī's father fled to Ḥarran into the service of Ṣalāh al-Dīn's son Ashraf. Ibn al-Qifṭī sought patronage in Aleppo as secretary to the former governor of Jerusalem and Nablus, Fāris al-Din Maimūn al Qaṣrī, the then vizier to the Ayyubid emir Ṣalāh al-Dīn's third son, Malik aẓ-Ẓāhir Ghāzi. He was recognised as an effective administrator of the fiefs and when the vizier died in 610/1214 aẓ-Ẓāhir appointed him khāzin of the Dīwān of Finance, despite his own preference for study. On aẓ-Ẓāhir's death in 613/1216 al-Qifti retired but was re-appointed three years later by aẓ-Ẓāhir's successor. He remained in office until 628/1231. According to his protégé and biographer, Yaqūt, writing before 624/1227 al-Qifti already held the honorific title "al-Qāḍī 'l-Akram al-Wazir" (most noble judge chief minister). After a five-year sabbatical al-Qifṭī took up the office of vizier in 633/1236 and held it up to his death in 646/1248. During that time he was also a member, along with Shams al-Din Lu'lu' al-Amini, of the regency council that governed on behalf of an-Nasir Yusuf.

Throughout his life al-Qifṭī advocated scholarship and sought to pursue a literary career despite heavy constraints of high office. When Yaqūt had fled the Mongol invasion to Aleppo, he had received shelter from al-Qifti, who had assisted him in the compilation of his great geographical and biographical encyclopedia, known as Irshad. Yaqut lists al-Qifṭī's pre-620 works (some were then incomplete). Al-Ṣafadī copied this list in his Wāfī fi 'l-Wafayāt and Al-Kutubī's Fawāt al-Wafayat (1196) borrowed from it, but his copy is corrupted by many errors.

== Works ==
Al-Qifṭī wrote mainly historical works and of 26 recorded titles just two survive. Most were destroyed during the Mongol invasion.

=== Extant ===
- Kitāb Ikhbār al-'Ulamā' bi Akhbār al-Ḥukamā (إخبار العلماء بأخبار الحكماء); abbrev. Ta'rikh al-Ḥukama (تاريخ الحكماء), 'The biographies and the books of the great philosophers'; a biographical dictionary of 414 physicians, philosophers and astronomers; the most important source of exact sciences and Hellenistic tradition in Islām and sole literary witness of many accounts by ancient Greek scholars.
- Inbā ar-Rawat 'alā 'Anbā an-Nuhat (3 vol.); synopsis (647/1249) by Muḥammad ibn 'Alī az-Zawanī.

=== Lost ===
- Precious Pearls of the Account of the Master (Ad-Dur ath-Thamin fi 'Akhbar al-Mutīmīn) (الدر الثمين في أخبار المتيمين)
- Report of the Muhammad Poets, (Akhbar al-Muhammadin min al-Shuara), (posthumous); only fragments
- History of Maḥmūd b. Sübüktigin (Sabuktakin) and His Sons'(wabanīhi, in al-Kubutī wabakīyat)
- History of the Seljuks, from the Beginning to the End of the Dynasty (Baqiat Tārīkh as-Siljūqīa) (بقية تاريخ السلجوقية)
- Apostles of Poets; arranged by al-Aba' up to Muḥammad bin Sa'īd; posthumous work written by al-Hasan ibn al-Haytham; History of the Poets; only poets named Muḥammad extant) (Kitāb al-Muhmidīn min ash-Shu'ra'i; ratibah 'alā al-Ābā' wa balagh bīhī Muḥammad bin Sa'id.) (كتاب المحمدين من الشعراء. رتبه على الآباء وبلغ به محمد بن سعيد) (wa Katab 'an al-Hasan bin al-Haythm) (وكتب عن الحسن بن الهيثم)
- History of the Mirdasids (Akhbar al-Mirdas) (أخبار آلمرداس)
- The Biographies and Books of the Great Philosophers (Akhbar al-Alama bi Akhyar al-Hukama)(إخبار العلماء بأخيار الحكماء)
- Account of the Grammarians (Akhbar an-Nahwiyyin) (إخبار النحوين); survives only in abstract by Muh. b. Ahmad al-Dhahabi.
- Account of the Writers and their Writings (Akhbar al-Musanafin wa ma Sanafuh) (أخبار المصنفين وما صنفوه)
- History of the Yemen (Tarikh al-Yemen) (تاريخ اليمن)
- Egypt; in six parts ('Akhbār Misr, fi sitta 'Ajza') (أخبار مصر، في ستة أجزاء):: including
- History of Cairo until the reign of Salah al-Din; identical to Comprehensive Tarikh al-Qifti contained in the epitome of Ibn Maktum (d. 749/1348)
- History of the Buyids
- History of the Maghreb
- Correction of Errors by al-Jawhari (Islāh Khilal as-Sahāhi, lil-Jawhrī) (إصلاح خلل الصحاح، للجوهري،)
- Nahza al-Khater in Literature (Nahazat al-Khāṭr >> fi-l-Adab) (نهزة الخاطر» في الأدب); History of Scholarship (the Shaykhs of al-Kindi), a supplement to the Ansab of al-Baladhuri, etc.
- Biographies of Ibn Rashiq, Abu Sa'id al-Sirafi

== See also ==
- Muslim historiography
