= Al-Firdaws Madrasa =

Madrasa in Aleppo, Syria

Coordinates: 36°11′12″N 37°9′19.5″E

al-Firdaws Madrasa
- مَدْرَسَة الْفِرْدَوْس
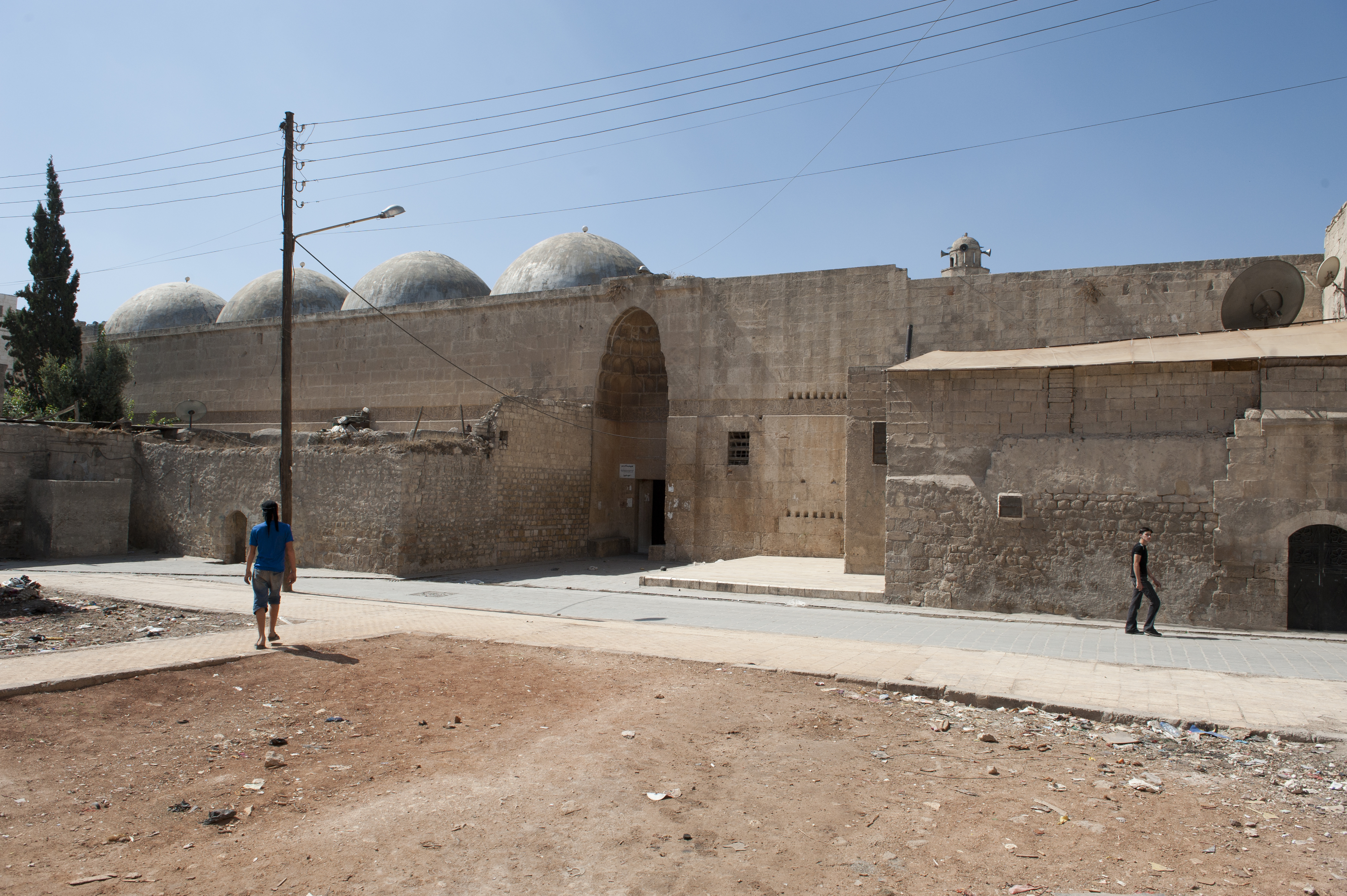
- Al-Firdaws Madrasa (in 2010)

Location
- Bab al-Maqam district Aleppo; Syria

Information
- Type: Madrasa
- Established: 1236
- Campus: Urban
- Affiliation: Islamic

Al-Firdaws Madrasa (Arabic: مَدْرَسَة الْفِرْدَوْس, romanized: Madrasat al-Firdaws), also known as School of Paradise, is a 13th-century complex located southwest of Bab al-Maqam in Aleppo, Syria and consists of a madrasa, mausoleum and other functional spaces. It was established in 1235/36 by Dayfa Khatun, who would later serve as the Ayyubid regent of Aleppo. It is the largest and best known of the Ayyubid madrasas in Aleppo. Due to its location outside the city walls, the madrasa was developed as a freestanding structure.

== Historical background and environment ==
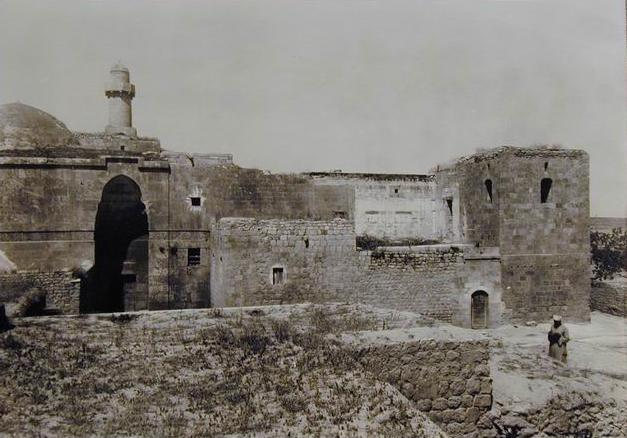
Al-Firdaws Madrasa in the early 20th century

Built in 1236 by the queen al-Malika Dayfa Khatun, the Madrasa al-Firdaws was funded through the queen's personal resources. These funds stemmed from a waqf that she established for the madrasa that consisted of the income of the village of Kafr Zayta and two-thirds of the income from a nearby mill. The complex was intended to serve as an important center for Muslim worship and Islamic learning as evidenced by the functionaries Dayfa appointed to the madrasa: Quran reciters, fuqah’s or jurists, and members of Sufi orders.

In the 13th century, Aleppo had become a major center for commerce and religion. During the Ayyubid period, the majority of Aleppines were merchants with a strong inclination towards Shia Islam. Overcrowding in the city led to the construction of large monuments, including the al-Firdaws Madrasa, outside of the city walls. The site surrounding the madrasa is referred to as the "Maqamat" or "maqam" area. In this case, the term maqam denotes the spiritual power and resonance of an area where a prophet once resided or stayed. While this was not the only maqamat area dedicated to Abraham in Aleppo, the importance of the madrasa within the maqamat area outside of the city is significant as it dictates why the site became a burial area as well as an area for spiritual retreat. Its label as a maqam location incited a powerful level of spiritual resonance and its location away from the packed city created a more spiritual area than the other maqams.

Another important factor relating to the madrasa location is its proximity to the main road leading out of the city and on to Damascus. This road was not only used each year for the Hajj procession, but also lead through the main gate of Aleppo known as the Bab al-Maqam and to the Citadel at the cities center. The placement of the madrasa at an area with so much traffic would likely have been intentional in order demonstrate the power and wealth of the ruler of Aleppo to any passerby. In addition, the sites strong religious ties would have earned continuous words of prayer from anyone moving by.

== Architecture ==
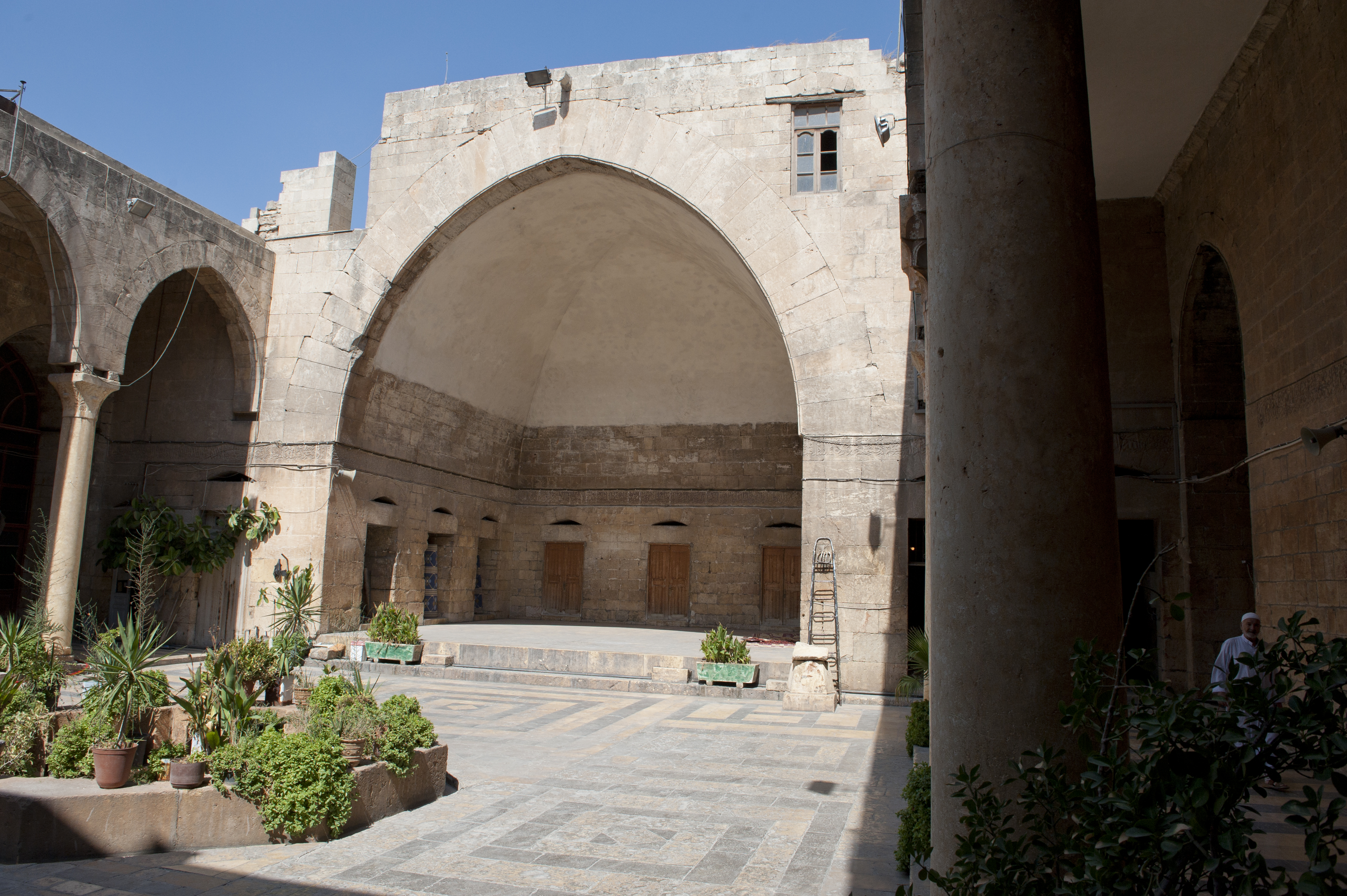
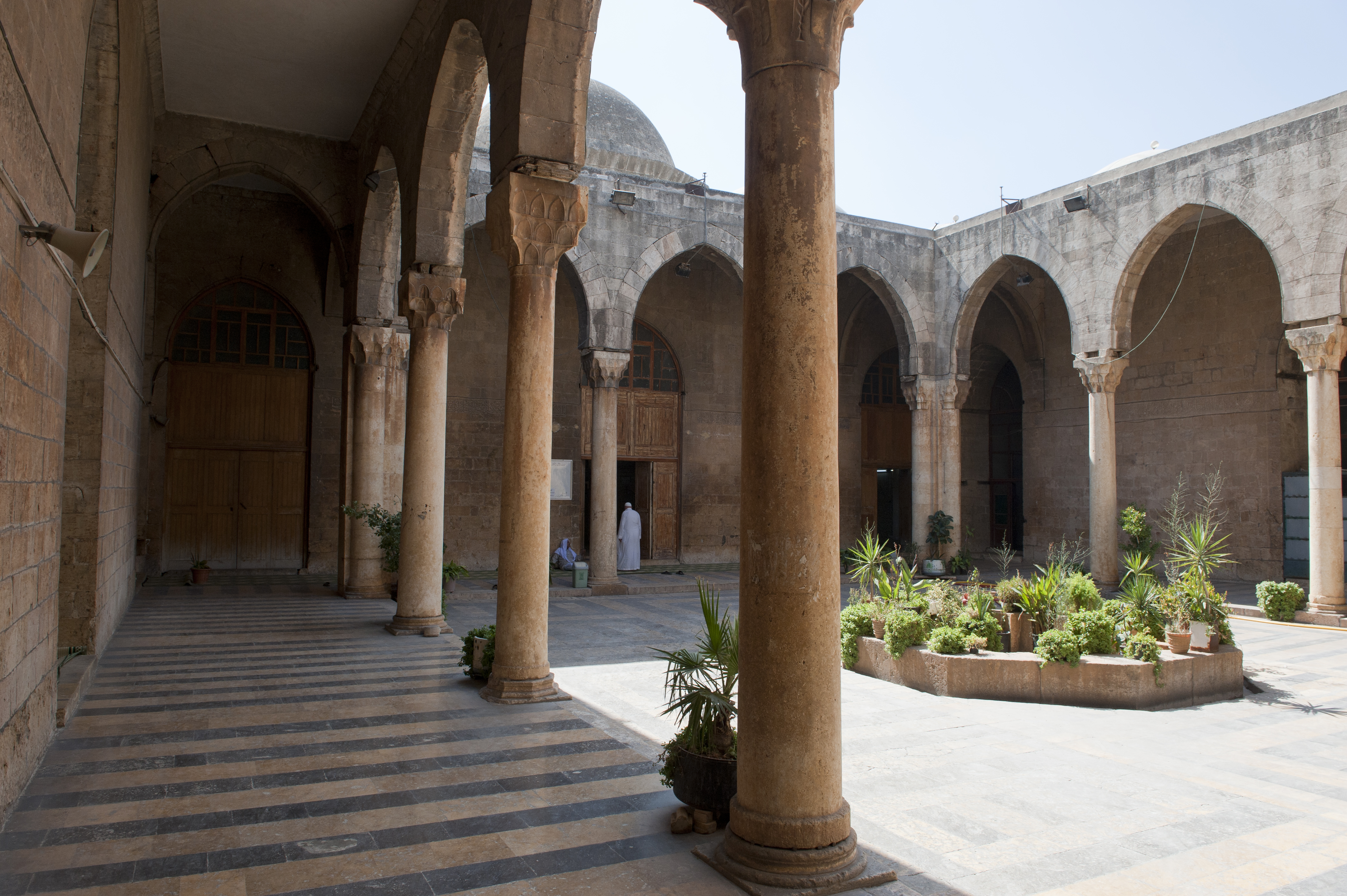
The courtyard of the madrasa, looking north (left) and looking south (right)

The Madrasa al-Firdaws was built outside of the city walls of Aleppo so there were few limitations when considering its architectural planning. The style of the building can be characterized by its visible regularity and rationale when observing its architectural details. This emphasis on regularity is not commonly seen in other examples of Syrian medieval architecture. It is rectangular in shape and topped by 11 domes. At its center is a courtyard, measuring approximately 55 metres by 45 metres, which follows the ancient 3-4-5 ratio in which a rectangular area was made by combining two pythagorean triangles. The heights of the building's columns shared the same measurement as the distance in between columns. Geometric references like these are seen throughout the building's plan to reinforce its regularity. The building is based on a four-iwan plan, in which four spaces opened into central courtyard where they met. However, this plan was altered to only include one iwan on one side of the building. The remaining three sides are surrounded by domes. On either side of the northern iwan there is an entrance to a smaller iwan and two, double storied residences were eventually added to house those who would come to the madrasa. According to Sbit ibn al-‘Ajami the northern iwan would have overlooked an enclosed garden with a pool. This view combined with inscriptions wrapping around the building would have evoked ideas of paradise for those who visited. There are two lengthy Arabic inscriptions in on the Madrasa al-Firdaws which together span over more than seventy meters. One can be read around the eastern facade while the other surrounded the courtyard. The inscription around the eastern facade was taken from the Quranic verses 6:85 and 12:4-6 in which believers were promised a Paradise where they would be "served on plates of gold". The inscription around the courtyard draws upon poetry and mysticism to describe the activities of members of the Sufi order who would have congregated at the madrasa.

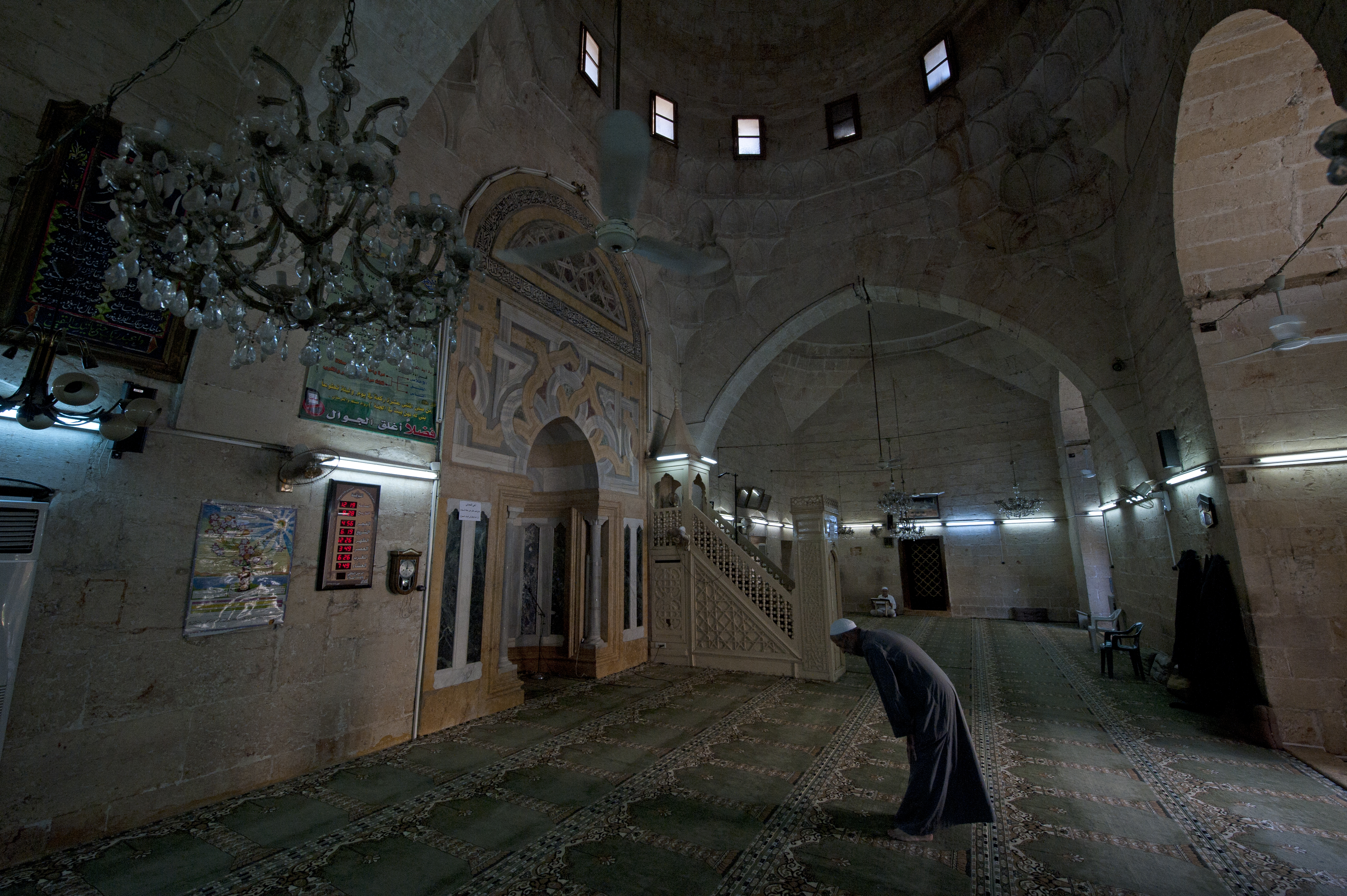
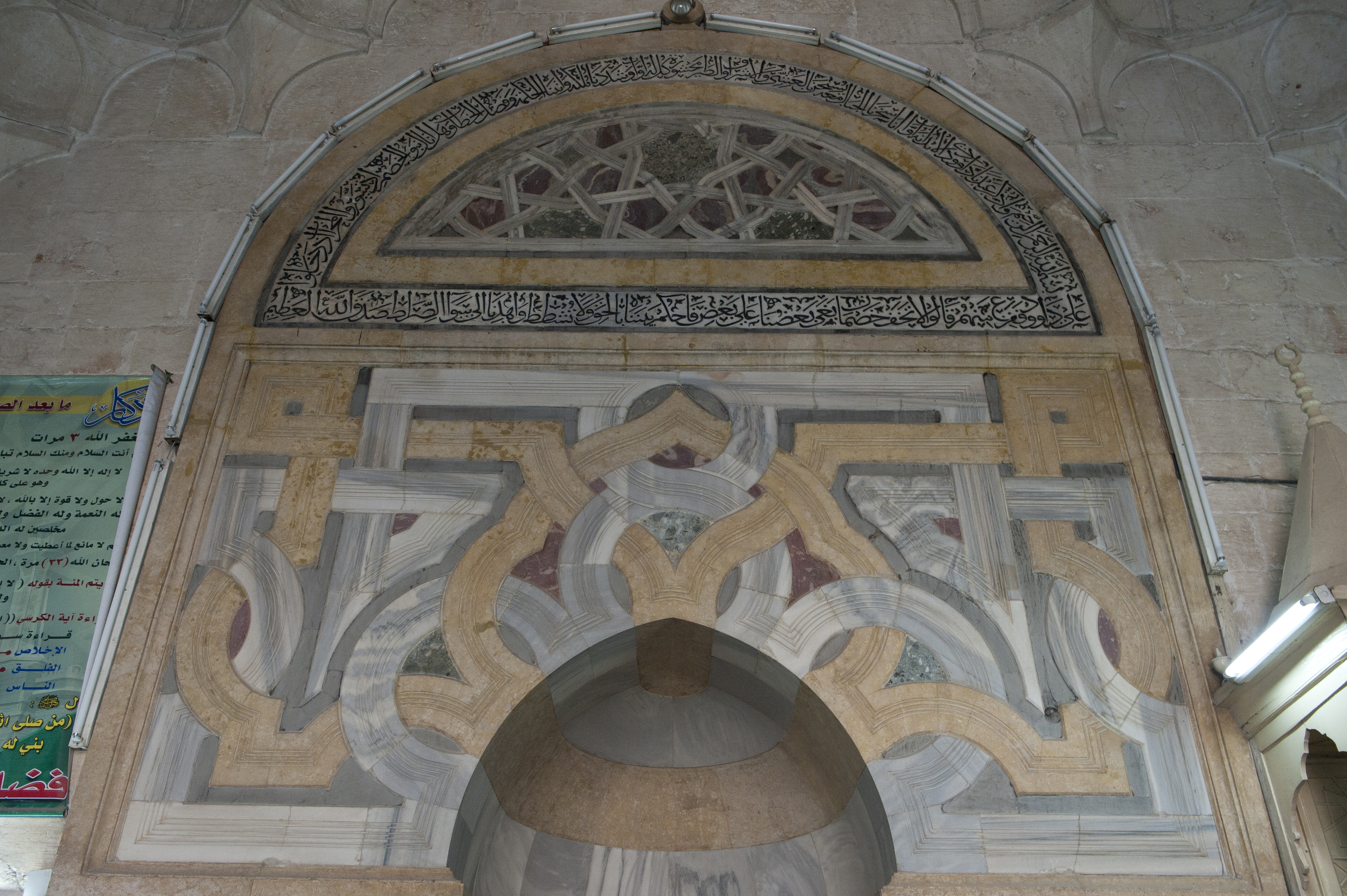
The prayer hall, with close-up of the mihrab decoration (right)

On the southern side of the courtyard is an interior mosque or prayer hall roofed by three domes, with the central one larger than the two others. The central dome covers the space in front of the mihrab (niche symbolizing the direction of prayer). The ornate mihrab is faced with a polychrome marble mosaic composition with interlacing patterns, with another semi-circular above this. This is an important example of mihrab design from the Ayyubid period and illustrates the techniques that were influential in later Mamluk architectural decoration. The minbar stands next to the mihrab. Similar mihrabs can be found in other Ayyubid-period buildings, including the Khanqah Al-Farafira, Al-Shadhbakhtiya Madrasa and the now-destroyed Al-Sultaniyya Madrasa. This mihrab style also appears in later buildings, such as the Behramiyah Mosque.

== Function ==
Al-Firdaws was founded to house many facilities for religious as well as familial purposes for the queen's family. Among the complex was the mausoleum, the madrasa, the ribat, the khanqa and the zawiya. The mausoleum was created to house the bodies of the queen and her family, as well as several saints later on. The Ayyubid standards for mausoleums called for the structure to be raised, in a clean site and being located near a holy place. This mausoleum upheld Ayyubid standards by being located at a raised and clean site without any dirty water or waste nearby. al-Firdaws also follows the Ayyubid mausoleum rules because it is located near a holy site: the Maqam of Abraham. Because of the mausoleum being located in the al-Firdaws complex, the site is technically a "funerary madrasa" by definition. The madrasa itself was a formal school that maintained a traditional teaching method. Students would live with one man in an apprentice-type learning environment to learn from him. This education would most usually be for gaining religious knowledge and was seen as a good moral action. Also in the complex was the ribat, part of the structure that originally would have been a small fort defended by volunteers. However, this ribat was more of a religious space acting as a hospice and shelter for the poor in Aleppo. The khanqa was a space for the Sufi scholars who would be trained in law instead of the religious teachings from the madrasa. The zawiya served as a more informal school where the teacher would approach each student differently and there were less rules than at the ribat or the khanqa.

== See also ==
- Late medieval domes
