= Hdatta =

Coordinates: 35.983°N 43.353°E

Hdatta or Haditha (Classical Syriac: ܚܕܬܐ Ḥdatta, Arabic: الحديثة al-Ḥadīt̲a), was a historical city on the East bank of the Tigris just below its confluence with the Upper Zab. The city flourished during the Sasanian and early Islamic periods.

The town was apparently established by the Sasanians, hence its Middle Persian name Newkart (literally "Newly Founded"), which corresponds with its Syriac and later Arabic names. According to al-Baladhuri, the town gained its name when the inhabitants of Firuz Shabur (Pirisabora; Anbar) of central Mesopotamia migrated to this location and transferred the name of their newly founded city with them. The city became renowned as a bishopric centre of the Church of the East within the ecclesiastical province of Adiabene. There existed also a substantial number of Jews, many of whom were converted to Christianity at the hand of its bishop Titus of Hdatta in the 6th century.

The city prospered and expanded during the Abbasid period, and the fourth Caliph Al-Hadi made it his capital before his death. The Abbasid general Musa ibn Bugha had his headquarters in Haditha during the Anarchy at Samarra. The population of the city remained Christian mostly belonging to the Church of the East. Some of Hdatta's bishops, such as Abraham of Marga, rose to the rank of the Catholicos of the East, others such as Yeshudad of Merv authored important theological books.

The father of Ibn Batish (died 1257) was a native of Hdatta.

The city's importance declined and it was eventually ruined and deserted after the Mongol invasion in the 13th century.

== See also ==
- Kashkar
