= Siege of Aleppo (1260) =

Siege during the Mongol invasion of Syria

- Part of the Mongol invasions of Syria
Date	24 January 1260
Location	Aleppo, modern-day Syria 36.198133°N 37.16328°E
Result	Mongol victory; The Mongols captured Aleppo and the Ayyubids' remaining territories; Muslim and Jewish inhabitants slaughtered

Belligerents
Ilkhanate; Armenian Kingdom of Cilicia; Principality of Antioch	Ayyubid dynasty; Muslim and Jewish inhabitants of Aleppo

Commanders and leaders
Hulegu Khan; Hethum I; Bohemond VI	Al-Mu'azzam Turanshah (POW)

Casualties and losses
Unknown	Heavy

The siege of Aleppo was a major military engagement during the Mongol invasions of the Levant, lasting from 17 January to 24 January 1260. The Mongol army under Hulagu Khan, supported by forces from the Armenian Kingdom of Cilicia and the Principality of Antioch, besieged the Ayyubid-held city after crossing the Euphrates and capturing nearby settlements.

== Background ==
In the 11th century, Aleppo became a contested center of power between competing Seljuk leaders and local dynasties. Alp Arslan ibn Chagri-beg faced internal conflict within the Seljuk clan early in his reign, defeating rival family members and consolidating authority. He later extended Seljuk influence into Syria and made the Mirdasid dynasty of Aleppo his vassal in 1070. After receiving the submission of Harran and Edessa, Mongol leader Hulagu Khan crossed the Euphrates, sacked Manbij and placed Aleppo under siege.

Hulegu left Azerbaijan in September 1259 and sent advance forces under the Kitbuqa Noyan ahead of the main army. The Mongol forces moved through the regions east of Lake Van, passing through Diyarbakir, where they began systematically subduing towns in Upper Mesopotamia. Hulagu himself captured several settlements, including Edessa, Nusaybin, and Harran, before advancing across the Euphrates River toward Syria.

== Siege ==
As the Mongol army approached Aleppo, an-Nasir Yusuf abandoned the city and withdrew toward Damascus, while the Mongols prepared for the assault using numerous catapults to batter the city's defenses. In January 1260, Hulegu's forces crossed the Euphrates and invested Aleppo. The city was defended by local garrisons under al-Malik al-Mu'azzam Turanshah, a son of Saladin. Mongol troops captured the city after a week-long siege, while the citadel held out for an additional month before surrendering.

Despite the fall of the city, Hulegu allowed the surviving defenders to live, though the citadel was subsequently destroyed. Following the capture of Aleppo, the Mongols received the submission of nearby cities, including Harim, Hama, and Homs. Local rulers who submitted were either reinstated in their positions under Mongol oversight or replaced by Mongol-appointed officials.

== Aftermath ==
The ensuing massacre, which lasted six days, was methodical and thorough, in which nearly all adult male Muslims and Jews were killed and most of the women and children were sold into slavery. Also included in the destruction was the burning of the Great Mosque of Aleppo.

Following the siege, Hulagu had some of Hethum's troops executed for burning the mosque. Some sources state that Bohemond VI of Antioch (leader of the Franks) personally saw to the mosque's destruction. Later, Hulagu Khan restored to Hethum castles and districts which the Ayyubids had previously conquered from the Armenians. Also Ibrahim, the brother of Ibn Batish, was killed during the siege.

== See also ==
- Sack of Aleppo by the Timurids (1400)

== Sources ==
- al-Māniʿ, ʿAbd al-ʿAzīz b. Nāṣir [in Arabic] (1976). An Edition of Ghayāt al-Wasāʾil Ilā Maʿrifat al-Awāʾil by Ismāʿīl b. Hibat Allāh al-Mawṣilī, Known as Ibn Bāṭīsh (575–655/1179–1257) (PhD diss.). University of Exeter.
- Amitai-Preiss, Reuven (1995). Mongols and Mamluks: The Mamluk-Ilkhanid War, 1260-1281 (illustrated, reprint ed.). Cambridge University Press. ISBN 9780521462266.
- Asbridge, Thomas S. (2010). The Crusades: The Authoritative History of the War for the Holy Land. New York: HarperCollins. ISBN 978-0060787288.
- Boyle, John Andrew (1968). The Cambridge History of Iran: Volume 5, The Saljuq and Mongol Periods. Cambridge University Press. ISBN 9780521069366.
- Grousset, RenÃ© (1970). The Empire of the Steppes: A History of Central Asia. New Brunswick, New Jersey: Rutgers University Press. ISBN 978-0813506272.
- Grousset, René (1991). The Empire of the Steppes: A History of Central Asia. Rutgers University Press.
- Kagay, Donald J.; Villalon, L. J. Andrew (2003). Crusaders, Condottieri, and Cannon: Medieval Warfare in Societies Around the Mediterranean. History of Warfare. Vol. 16. Leiden: Brill. ISBN 978-9004125537.
- Riley-Smith, Jonathan; Christopher, Simon; Edbury, Peter W.; Phillips, Jonathan P. (2003). The Experience of Crusading. Vol. 1. Cambridge University Press.
- Saunders, John Joseph (1972). A History of Medieval Islam. Routledge & Kegan Paul.
