= Ishodad of Merv =

Persian bishop and theologian

Mar Ishodad of Merv (Classical Syriac: ܡܵܪܼܝ ܝܼܫܘܿܥܕܵܕ ܡܲܪܘܼܙܵܝܵܐ, romanized: Mār^{i} Ishoʿdāḏ Maruzāyā; fl. AD 850) was an Assyrian Christian prelate who served as Bishop of Hdatta during the Abbasid Caliphate. He was a prominent theologian of the Church of the East, best known for his Commentaries, which covered the Syriac Bible.

== Life ==
Very little is known of Ishoʿdad's life, but a few details have survived in annotations to the list of patriarchs compiled by Mari ibn Suleiman and Amr ibn Matta. His epithet "of Merv" may denote a birthplace, meaning that he was born in the city of Merv in Khorasan, but this inference remains conjectural: his relationship to Merv is not known with certainty. A member of the Church of the East—historically, though inaccurately, known as the Nestorian church—he became bishop of Hdatta, a town close to the mouth of the Great Zab in modern Iraq, perhaps in 837 after Abraham II of Seleucia-Ctesiphon left the see to become Patriarch of the Church of the East.

Ishodad was a candidate for the patriarchate of the Church of the East around 853 after Abraham's death. At the time the patriarchate was subject to the Abbasid Caliphate, and after two failed attempts to select a new patriarch, a secretary of the reigning caliph al-Mutawakkil, Ibrahim ibn Nuh al-Anbari, recommended Ishodad for the position. al-Mutawakkil, however, opted for the candidate of Vizier Bukhtishu, Theodosius of Seleucia-Ctesiphon, and Ishoʿdad remained at Hdatta in opposition to the new patriarch. He died shortly afterwards.

== Commentaries ==
Ishodad is best known for his extensive Syriac exegesis of the Old and New Testaments, the Commentaries. The Commentaries were widely influential in the Syriac world, not only in the Church of the East but also the miaphysite West Syriac Orthodox Church. The West Syriac author Jacob Bar-Salibi, for example, made use of Ishodad's work in his own commentaries on the Psalms.

=== Contents ===
The subjects of Ishodad's commentaries are as follows:

Old Testament

- The Pentateuch
- The Book of Sessions:^{[a]}
  - Joshua
  - Samuel
  - Kings
  - Ecclesiastes
  - Ruth
  - Song of Songs
  - Job
  - Sirach
- Isaiah
- Twelve Prophets
- Jeremiah
- Ezekiel
- Daniel
- Psalms

New Testament

- The four Gospels
- Acts of the Apostles
- Three "Catholic Epistles":
  - James
  - 1 Peter
  - 1 John
- Epistles of St Paul:
  - Romans
  - 1 and 2 Corinthians
  - Galatians
  - Ephesians
  - Philippians
  - Colossians
  - 1 and 2 Thessalonians
  - 1 and 2 Timothy
  - Titus
  - Philemon
  - Hebrews

=== Characteristics ===
Ishodad's work largely followed the lines set by Theodore of Mopsuestia, the pre-eminent biblical interpreter of the Church of the East. Jacques-Marie Vosté went as far as to argue that Ishodad's arguments themselves could constitute an important source for the reconstruction of Theodore's own views given the paucity of that writer's surviving corpus, though this argument has not been accepted by later scholars. Nonetheless, Ishodad differed from Theodore in certain significant respects. Against Theodore, he accepted the canonicity of the Book of Job and the Song of Songs. Moreover, he drew on a wide range of previous commentators beyond Theodore, including Gregory of Nyssa, Gregory Nazianzen, Basil of Caesarea, and John Chrysostom, and among Syriac authors Aba I, Ephrem the Syrian, Narsai, and Henana of Adiabene.

Clemens Leonhard describes the Commentaries as having a "generally sober character". In line with the traditional view of the exegetical School of Antioch, Ishodad openly rejects allegorical interpretation, and focuses on historical and philosophical problems in the texts. Paul S. Russell views Ishodad's work as displaying a "scholarly sensibility along the lines of modern biblical research" in its careful treatment of different editions of the scriptural texts.

Ishodad is the earliest authority to identify the disciple Nathanael, mentioned in John, with Bartholomew, one of the Twelve listed in the Synoptics.

=== Historical context ===
Ishodad wrote the Commentaries in a fraught context. Under al-Mutawakkil, the tolerance of the Abbasid Caliphate towards its Christian and Jewish subjects had begun to wane. Meanwhile, the Church of the East remained divided over the exegetical innovations of Henana of Adiabene, who had drawn on Greek and West Syriac sources in contrast to the official interpretive tradition of Theodore. Though the increasingly characteristic pessimism of the works of Ishodad's era is not evident in the Commentaries, their intended audience is limited to Christian scholars, reflecting a period in which the possibilities for interreligious dialogue were declining.

=== Modern editions ===
The first modern edition of Ishodad's works was prepared by Gustav Diettrich, who published selections of Ishodad's commentaries on the Old Testament in 1902. His New Testament commentaries were edited and translated into English in five volumes by Margaret Dunlop Gibson in 1911–16; Ceslas Van den Eynde prepared a complete edition and translation into French of the Old Testament commentaries in 1950–81.

== Notes ==
a. These are treated as a single book in Syriac tradition.
