= Jamal al-Din Shadbakht =

Jamāl al-Dīn Shādbakht al-Hindī (fl. 12th century) was a mamluk and atabeg of Zengid ruler as-Salih Ismail al-Malik who served as lieutenant of Aleppo citadel between 1174 and 1181.

Shādbakht was an Indian freed slave of Nur al-Din Zengi, and played an important role in the transfer of power from Nur al-Din to his son as-Salih. During the transition of power to Saladin, he was stripped of his position and transferred to the fortress of Azaz in 1183.

Shadbakht built two madrassas in Aleppo, including the al-Shadbakhtiyah Madrasa, which was completed in 1193, as well as a khanqah in Harran.
