= Bab al-Maqam =

Gate of Aleppo, Syria

Coordinates: 36°11′31.5″N 37°9′37″E

- بَاب الْمَقَام
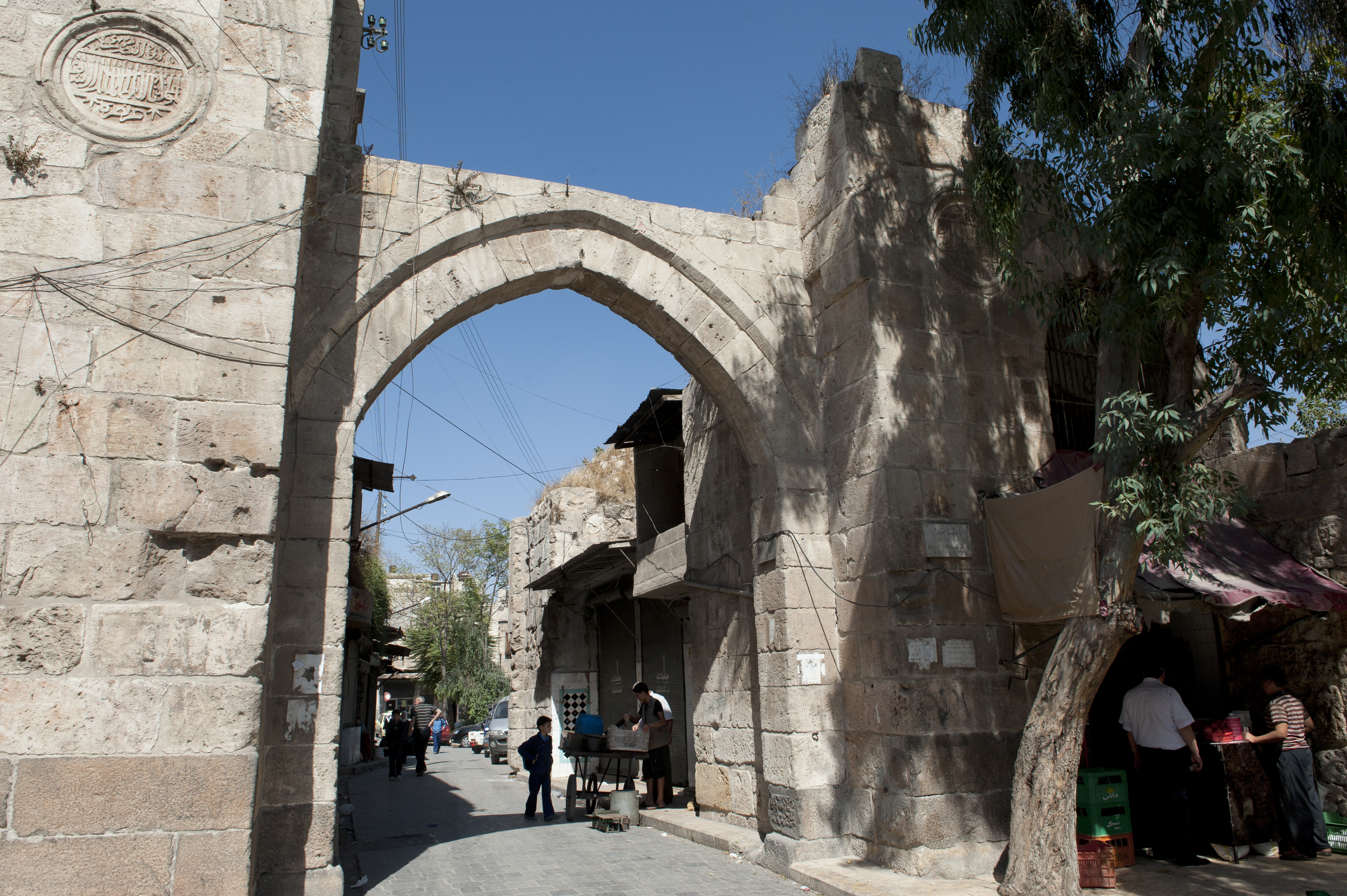
- Bab al-Maqam in 2010
- Interactive map of Bab al-Maqam
- Alternative names: Gate of Maqam

General information
- Status: restored
- Type: City gate
- Architectural style: Islamic architecture
- Location: Aleppo, Syria
- Completed: 1230
- Owner: Al-Aziz Muhammad
- Known for: One of the 9 main gates of the ancient city walls of Aleppo

Bab al-Maqam (Arabic: بَاب الْمَقَام, romanized: Bāb al-Maqām), meaning the Gate of Maqam is one of the Gates of Aleppo.

The 13th century structure was built by al-Aziz Muhammad on the road that connected the Maqamat with the Citadel.

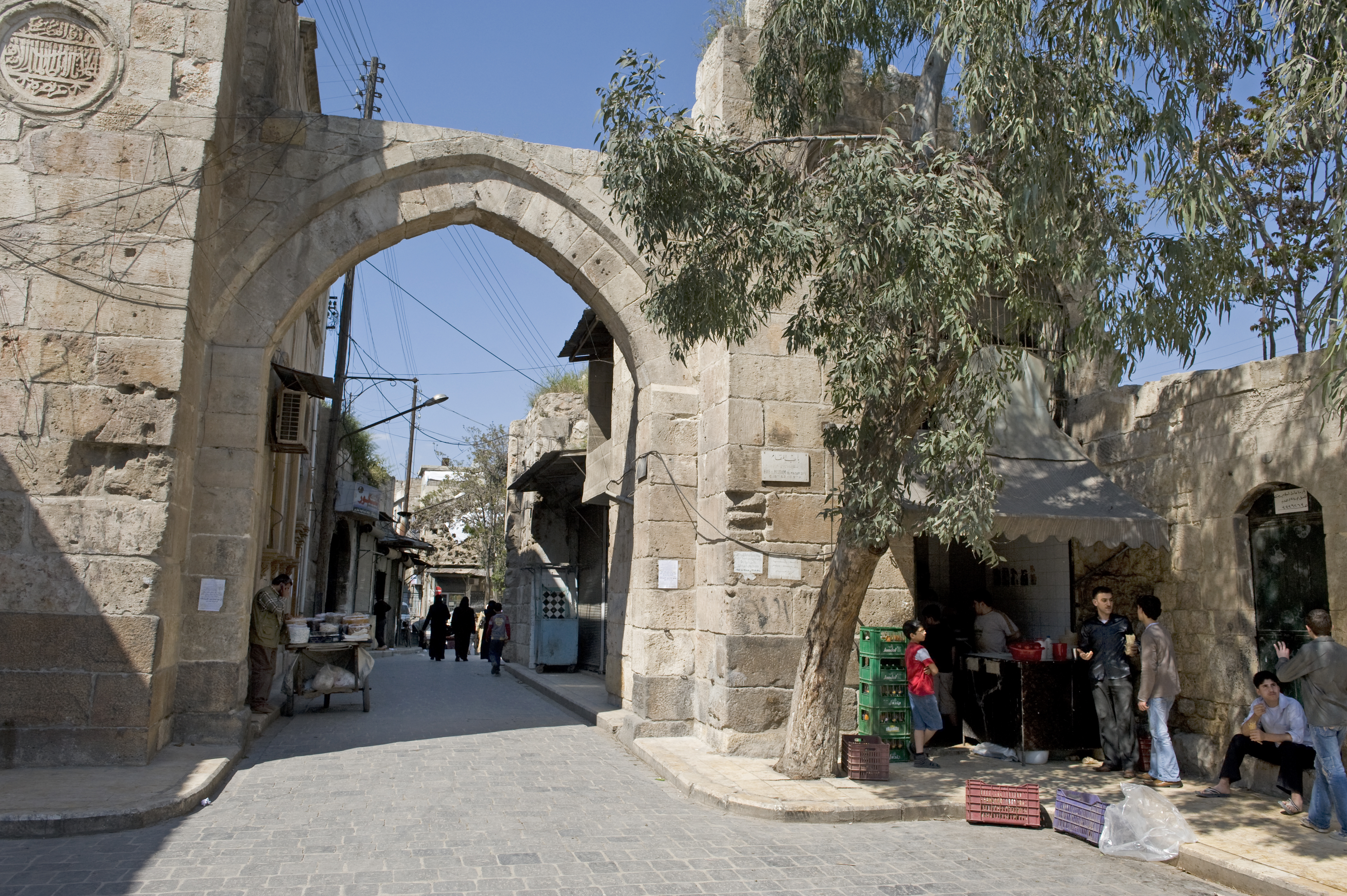
View of the gate from street

Deviations in its design from the majority of medieval Syrian gates suggest that its function was ceremonial rather than military.

In Constructions of Power and Piety in Medieval Aleppo (1997), Yasser Tabbaa details some of these differences, noting that they reinforce the possibility that the gate had primarily a religious and political function, serving as homage to Abraham and contrasting with the eastern shrines of Mashhad al-Dikka and Mashhad al-Husayn.
