= Al-Mu'azzam Turanshah ibn Salah al-Din =

Kurdish military commander

Al-Muʿaẓẓam Tūrānshāh ibn Ṣalāḥ al-Dīn (c. 1181 – 1260) was a Kurdish military commander and Ayyubid prince, a son of Ṣalāḥ al-Dīn (Saladin). For his long but undistinguished career, he has been described as "a courageous if not very gifted soldier".

Al-Muʿaẓẓam was born around 1181. He was named in honour of his uncle, al-Muʿaẓẓam Tūrānshāh, who died in 1180. His full name was al-Malik al-Muʿaẓẓam Tūrānshāh Fakhr al-Dīn Abū Manṣūr ibn Ṣalāḥ al-Dīn. In 1186, he was living with his mother and his full brother, Malikshāh, in Damascus when the ill Saladin summoned the three of them to his bedside in Ḥarrān. Saladin had a house with a bath built for them for their stay in Ḥarrān. According to Ibn Shaddād, al-Muʿaẓẓam was brought to witness the siege of Acre in 1191 as his initiation into the art of war, although he would not actually engage in combat for several years.

In 1234, al-Muʿaẓẓam led the army of the emir of Aleppo in Sultan al-Kāmil's war against the Seljukids. When the remnants of the Khwarazmian army invaded Syria in 1240, he led the 1,500 available cavalry of Aleppo against them. Outnumbered eight to one, he was crushed in battle on 2 November.

In 1250, al-Muʿaẓẓam and his only surviving brother, Nuṣrat al-Dīn, led contingents from Aleppo during al-Nāṣir Yūsuf's invasion of Egypt. He and Nuṣrat al-Dīn were captured when the army was defeated by Aybak at the battle of Kurāʿ in 1251. They remained in honorable captivity in Cairo until a peace treaty was signed in 1253.

Although over eighty years old, al-Muʿaẓẓam was governing Aleppo on behalf of al-Nāṣir when the Mongols invaded Syria in 1259. He sent a force to disrupt them before they could reach Aleppo, but it retreated in the face of the superior forces of the Mongol commander Hülegü, who offered al-Muʿaẓẓam generous terms to surrender. Al-Muʿaẓẓam refused and on 18 January 1260 the siege of Aleppo began. The walls were breached on 25 January and the city was plundered and its inhabitants massacred and enslaved. Al-Muʿaẓẓam held out in the citadel until 25 February, when he sought terms. Impressed by al-Muʿaẓẓam's courage, given his age, Hülegü was unusually generous. The garrison was granted safe conduct, but al-Muʿaẓẓam died only a few days later.

== Bibliography ==
- Eddé, Anne-Marie [in French] (2016). Saladin. Flammarion.
- Humphreys, R. Stephen (1977). From Saladin to the Mongols: The Ayyubids of Damascus, 1193–1260. State University of New York Press.
- Hosler, John (2018). The Siege of Acre, 1189–1191: Saladin, Richard the Lionheart, and the Battle that Decided the Third Crusade. Yale University Press.
- Jackson, Peter, ed. (2007). The Seventh Crusade, 1244–1254: Sources and Documents. Ashgate.
- Jackson, Peter (2017). The Mongols and the Islamic World: From Conquest to Conversion. Yale University Press.
- Lyons, Malcolm Cameron; Jackson, D. E. P. (1982). Saladin: The Politics of the Holy War. Cambridge University Press.
