= Al-Shadbakhtiyah Madrasa =

al-Shadbakhtiyah Madrasa
- الْمَدْرَسَةُ الشَّاذْبَخْتِيَّةُ
- Aleppo; Syria

Information
- Type: madrasa
- Established: 1193
- Campus: Urban
- Affiliation: Islamic

Al-Shadbakhtiyah Madrasa (Arabic: الْمَدْرَسَةُ الشَّاذْبَخْتِيَّةُ, romanized: al-Madrasat aš-Šāḏbaḵtīyah) is a 12th-century madrasa complex in Aleppo, Syria. It was built by Jamal al-Din Shadbakht, an Indian mamluk of Nur al-Din Zengi, who served as a lieutenant of the Aleppo citadel at time of his master's death in 1174. The notable figures associated with the madrasa include Kamal al-Din ibn al-'Adim, who became a teacher here in 1220.

== See also ==
- Al-Firdaws Madrasa
- Al-Sultaniyah Madrasa
- Al-Uthmaniyah Madrasa
- Al-Zahiriyah Madrasa
- Ancient City of Aleppo
- Khusruwiyah Mosque
