= Battle of al-Kura =

Date	2 February 1251
Location	al-Kura, al-Salihiyya town, eastern edge of the Nile Delta, Egypt
Result	Mamluk victory

Belligerents
Ayyubids of Syria	Mamluks of Egypt

Commanders and leaders
An-Nasir Yusuf (WIA); Al-Ashraf Musa (POW); Shams ad-Din Lu'lu al-Amini (executed); Al-Mansur II Muhammad	Aybak; Faris al-Din Aktay; Husam ad-Din; Qutuz

Units involved
Nasiriyya Mamluks; Aziziyya Mamluks	Bahriyya Mamluks; Jamdariyya Mamluks; Mu'izziyya Mamluks

Casualties and losses
Unknown	Unknown

The Battle of al-Kura (Egyptian Arabic: معركة الكورة) was a military clash in medieval Egypt between an army of the Mamluks ruling Egypt and an army of the Ayyubids ruling Syria. The battle occurred on February 2, 1251, on a stretch of land called al-Kura, near the town of al-Salihiyya on the eastern edge of the Nile Delta.

== Background ==
With the assassination of the Ayyubid Sultan of Egypt al-Mu'azzam Turanshah by his own military slaves (Mamluks) in May 1250, Ayyubid rule in Egypt was ended. The Mamluks now took power themselves; their first sultan was al-Mu'izz Aybak. In Syria, however, the Ayyubids were able to assert themselves in the person of Sultan an-Nasir Yusuf. He was not prepared to accept the change of power in Egypt and, as a descendant of the dynasty's founder Saladin, claimed the throne in Cairo. However, according to the tradition of the historian Ibn Wasil, Sultan an-Nasir Yusuf was not of a particularly warlike nature and tried to avoid a military confrontation. The actual driving force behind the war preparations is said to have been his closest confidant and vizier, Shams ad-Din Lu'lu' al-Amini.

== Battle ==
On December 11, 1250, an-Nasir Yusuf and his army marched from Damascus and reached Gaza on December 28. As was common among rulers of the Islamic world at the time, his own army consisted mainly of slave warriors, i.e. Mamluks, consisting of the Aziziyya Regiment founded by his father and the Nasiriyya Regiment founded by himself. The military command over them was held by Shams ad-Din Lu'lu'. Also in the army were the cousins of Sultan an-Nasir Yusuf, the lord of Hama, al-Mansur II Muhammad, and the former ruler of Homs, al-Ashraf Musa.

In Cairo, Sultan al-Mu'izz Aybak mobilized his troops. On January 2, 1251, the general (amīr) Husam ad-Din with an advance guard was the first to leave Cairo for Palestine. The following day, General Faris al-Din Aktay set out, leading the particularly strong Bahriyya and Jamdariyya regiments. The two generals combined their forces on January 5 near the town of al-Salihiyya, where they also set up camp. Sultan Aybak joined them on January 23 with his Mu'izziyya regiment.

During this time, an-Nasir Yusuf had already continued his march from Gaza to Egypt and on February 2 surprised his enemy, who was still in his camp. Initially, the Syrian forces managed to inflict heavy attacks on the enemy, and some Egyptian troops were routed. But then a counterattack by Faris al-Din Aktay brought about the turning point, who held the position with his Bahriyya Regiment and ultimately routed the Syrian troops. The final victory for the Egyptians was ultimately decided by the betrayal of the Ayyubid military slaves, who defected to their Egyptian peers during the battle. An-Nasir Yusuf then fled and took refuge in Gaza. His cousin al-Ashraf Musa as well as his general Shams ad-Din Lu'lu' were taken prisoner by the Egyptians, of whom the latter was beheaded in front of Sultan Aybak.

The victorious Mamluks of Egypt were able to move back into Cairo on February 4, 1251.

== Aftermath ==
On March 22, 1251, Faris al-Din Aktay led an attack on Palestine and captured Gaza, creating a protective forecourt for Egypt. The militarily weakened an-Nasir Yusuf withdrew to Damascus and sought an alliance with the Crusader states in the Levant against the Mamluks of Egypt. Even if this, under the reign of the French King Louis IX, did not enter into a formal alliance with him, this political maneuvering between Cairo, Damascus and Acre created a balance of power in the Orient for years to come. The Mamluks were able to stabilize their rule in Egypt, while the Ayyubids remained limited to Syria. Through the mediation of Caliph al-Musta'sim, this situation was deepened in a contract between Damascus and Cairo in April 1253, and Gaza was also returned to an-Nasir Yusuf.

It was not until 1260 that the Mongol invasions of the Levant brought about a fundamental change in the situation. They ended Ayyubid rule in Syria, only to be subsequently defeated by the Mamluks at the Battle of Ain Jalut. They were then able to permanently unite Egypt and Syria under their rule.

== Bibliography ==
- Ibn Wasil: Mufarrij al-kurub fi akhbar bani Ayyub, BnF Paris, ms. Arabe 1703, fol. 102r–107v.
