= Al-Kutubi =

Syrian merchant and historian

Early manuscript of the ʿUyūn al-tawārīkh

Abū ʿAbdallāh Muḥammad ibn Shākir al-Dārānī al-Dimashqī al-Kutubī (1287–1363) was a Syrian merchant and historian.

Born into a poor family in Dārayyā in 1287, al-Kutubī later moved to Damascus and entered the book trade, where he made a fortune. His nickname, al-Kutubī, means "the bookseller". He spent his most of his life in Damascus and never held an official position either civic or religious. For these reasons, little is known about his life. He was a friend of al-Dhahabī and Ibn Kathīr. His funeral was held on 24 June 1363.

Al-Kutubī is known for two surviving works in Arabic. The ʿUyūn al-tawārīkh (The Historical Springs) is a general history of the Islamic world from the first year of the Hegira (AD 622–623) until 1359. It contains many bibliographies of scholars. It is a derivative but not completely unoriginal work, especially for the author's own time. The autograph manuscript of the last volume is preserved in Topkapı Palace, Ahmet III 2922. Another copy is in Cambridge University Library, 699 (Add. 2923). It is unpublished.

The Fawāt al-wafayāt (Beyond the Obituaries) is a supplement to the biographical dictionary of Ibn Khallikān. It contains 600 biographies of Syrian writers arranged alphabetically. It is preserved in Topkapı Palace, Ahmet III 2921, an autograph manuscript from 1352. By its nature, it contains much unique material. It has received several modern editions.

== Bibliography ==
- Krauss-Sánchez, Heidi R. (2010). "al-Kutubī, Ibn Shākir". In Graeme Dunphy (ed.). Encyclopedia of the Medieval Chronicle. Vol. 2. Brill. p. 985.
- Richards, D. S. (1998). "al-Kutubī, Abū ʿAbd Allāh Muḥammad Ibn Shākir". In Julie Scott Meisami; Paul Starkey (eds.). Encyclopedia of Arabic Literature. Vol. 2: K–Z. p. 459.
- Rosenthal, Franz (1986). "al-Kutubī". In Bosworth, C. E.; van Donzel, E.; Lewis, B. & Pellat, Ch. (eds.). The Encyclopaedia of Islam, Second Edition. Volume V: Khe–Mahi. Leiden: E. J. Brill. pp. 570–571. ISBN 978-90-04-07819-2.
