= Al-Aziz Muhammad =

Ayyubid emir of Aleppo from 1216 to 1236

- Al-Malik al-Aziz

Emir of Aleppo
- Reign: 8 October 1216 – 26 November 1236
- Predecessor: Az-Zahir Ghazi
- Successor: An-Nasir Yusuf
- Regent: Shihab ad-Din Toghrul
- Born: c. 1213
- Died: 26 November 1236
- Spouse: Fatima Khatun
- Issue: An-Nasir Yusuf; Ghaziya Khatun
- Dynasty: Ayyubid
- Father: Az-Zahir Ghazi
- Mother: Dayfa Khatun
- Religion: Islam

Al-Aziz Muhammad ibn Ghazi (c. 1213 – 26 November 1236) was the Kurdish Ayyubid Emir of Aleppo and the son of az-Zahir Ghazi and grandson of Saladin. His mother was Dayfa Khatun, the daughter of Saladin's brother al-Adil.

Al-Aziz was aged just three when his father az-Zahir Ghazi died in 1216 at the age of forty-five. He immediately inherited his father's position as ruler of Aleppo. A regency council was formed, which appointed Shihab ad-Din Toghrul as his Atabeg or guardian. Toghril was a mamluk of az-Zahir Ghazi and the effective ruler of Aleppo for the next fifteen years.

== Reign ==
Al-Aziz did not take actual control of power until the age of seventeen, at which point he retained Toghril as his treasurer. In general, he avoided becoming drawn into the complex disputes between different members of the Ayyubid dynasty, and concentrated instead on strengthening the defenses and infrastructure of Aleppo. Among the construction works begun by az-Zahir Ghazi and completed by al-Aziz Muhammad were the re-fortification of the citadel, and, within it, the building of the palace, the mosque, the arsenal and the water cisterns. Al-Aziz is known to have married Fatima Khatun, daughter of al-Kamil, who apparently shared his passion for building and commissioned the construction of two madrasas in Aleppo.

In 1232, shortly after al-Aziz attained his majority, Sultan al-Kamil of Egypt gathered a major force bringing together armies from across the Ayyubid confederation to attack Diyar Bakr. Aleppo was the only emirate which stood aloof and contributed no troops. However, in 1234, Al Aziz did furnish units which he contributed to another army led by al-Kamil which went out to invade Anatolia, probably heading for Malatya. Al-Aziz did not himself take part in the campaign, which in any case was driven back by the Seljuq forces of Sultan Ala ad-Din Kayqubad.

== Death ==
Al-Aziz died on 26 November 1236 at the age of twenty-three. His eldest son, an-Nasir Yusuf, was only seven years old, so al-Aziz's mother Dayfa Khatun assumed the regency. Al-Aziz's daughter, Ghaziya Khatun, married the Seljuq Sultan of Rum, Kaykhusraw II.

Al-Aziz Muhammad Ayyubid dynasty Born: 1213 Died: 26 November 1236
Regnal titles
Preceded by Az-Zahir Ghazi	Emir of Aleppo; 8 October 1216 – 26 November 1236 with Shihab ad-Din Toghril	Succeeded by An-Nasir Yusuf
