= Ibn al-Adim =

Arab biographer (1192–1262)

- ابن العديم
- Born: 1192; Aleppo, Syria
- Died: 1262 (aged 69–70); Cairo, Egypt
- Occupations: Historian, biographer, diplomat

Academic work
- Era: Ayyubid period
- Main interests: History, Biography
- Notable works: Bughyat al-Talab fī Tārīkh Ḥalab, Zubdat al-Halab fi ta'arikh Halab

Kamāl al-Dīn Abū ʾl-Ḳāsim ʿUmar ibn Aḥmad ibn Hibat Allāh Ibn al-ʿAdīm (Arabic: كمال الدين عمر بن أحمد ابن العديم; 1192–1262) was an Arab biographer and historian from Aleppo. He is best known for his works on the history of Aleppo. He is an important source of knowledge on the Syrian Order of Assassins, first analyzed by Silvester de Sacy (Lewis 1952).

== Career ==
Ibn al-ʿAdīm got his early education from Aleppo, Damascus and Mecca, and became a teacher at al-Shadbakhtiyah Madrasa in 1220. He was later appointed qadi of Aleppo. Numerous Ayyubid rulers entrusted Ibn al-ʿAdīm as a diplomatic ambassador. On his last mission in 1260, he was sent to Egypt seeking military assistance against the Mongols.

== Works ==
The best known work of Ibn al-ʿAdīm is Bughyat al-Talab fī Tārīkh Ḥalab (بغية الطلب في تاريخ حلب; Everything Desirable about the History of Aleppo), a multi-volume collection of biographies of famous men from Aleppo, introduced with a volume on the geography and traditions of the region. It is saved in part in manuscripts in the library of sultan Ahmed III in Topkapi Palace.

He also published a chronicle version of the work, Zubdat al-Halab fi ta'arikh Halab (زبدة الحلب في تأريخ حلب; The Cream of the History of Aleppo), a copy of which reached the library of Jean-Baptiste Colbert and then the Bibliothèque nationale de France, and selections of which were published with Latin translation by Georg Freytag in 1819. His historical sources are various, some oral and some written, and two of the more famous are Usama ibn Munqidh and Ibn al-Qalanisi (Lewis 1952).

Another work is a guide for the making of perfumes, Kitab al-Wuslat (or Wasilat) ila al-Habib fi Wasf al-Tayibat wal-tibb (الوصلة إلى الحبيب في وصف الطيّبات والطيب) (Houtsma 1927).
