= Ayyubid dynasty =

Sultanate in Egypt and Levant from 1171 to 1341

Ayyubid Sultanate of Egypt الأيوبيون (Arabic) al-Ayyūbīyūn
- 1171–1260^{a}
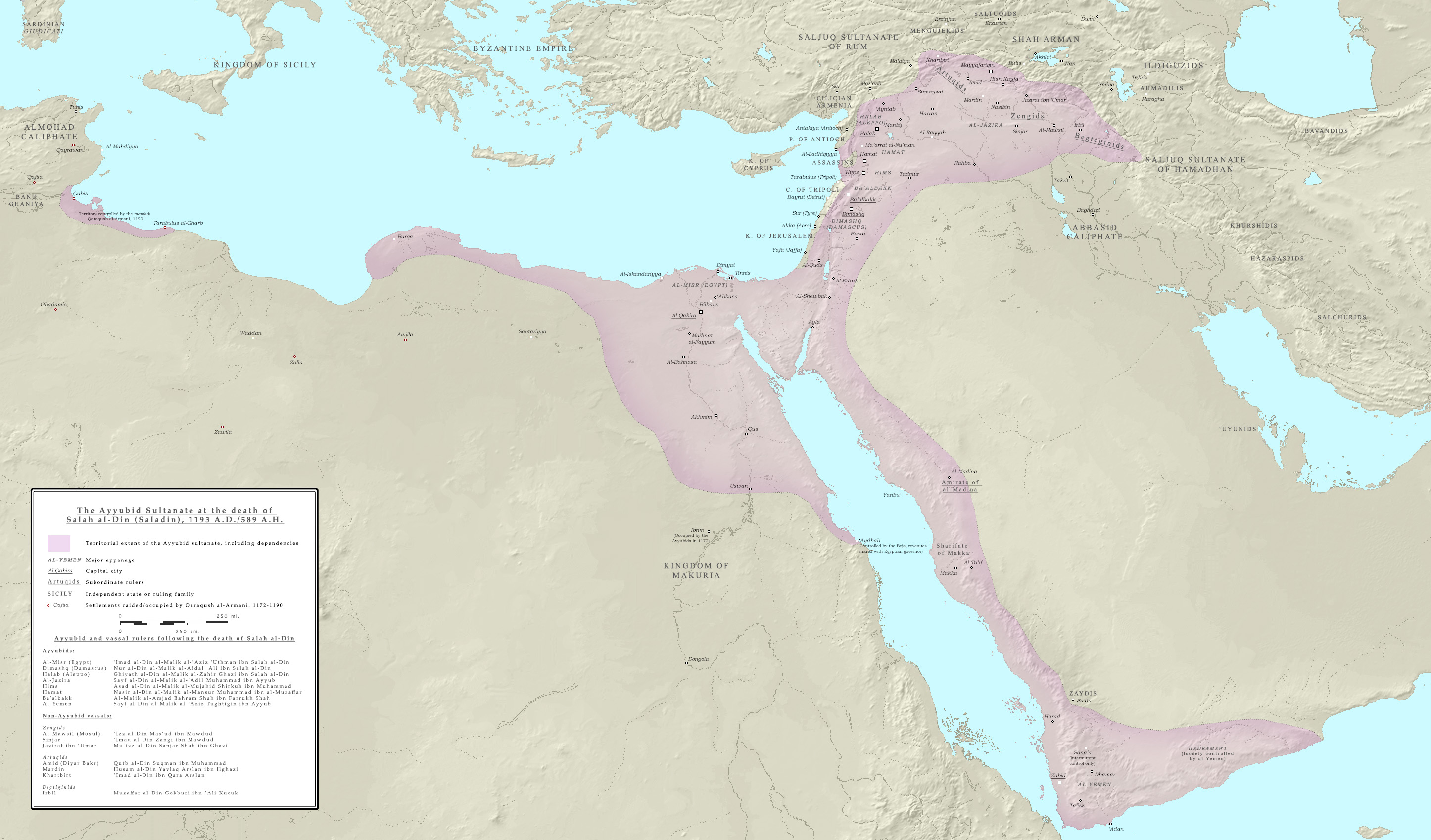
- Ayyubid Sultanate of Egypt (in pink) at the death of Saladin in 1193
- Status: Nominal vassal of the Abbasid Caliphate
- Capital: Cairo (1171–1174; 1218–1250); Damascus (1174–1218); Aleppo (1250–1260)
- Common languages: Arabic^{b} (majority, administration, science, poetry, numismatics); Kurdish (native language of the ruling family); Persian (spoken by some sultans); Turkic
- Religion: Sunni Islam (state); School: Shafi'i; Creed: Ash'ari
- Government: Sultanate (princely confederation)
- Sultan
  - 1174–1193: Saladin (first)
  - 1193–1198: Al-Aziz
  - 1198–1200: Al-Mansur
  - 1200–1218: Al-Adil I
  - 1218–1238: Al-Kamil
  - 1238–1240: Al-Adil II
  - 1240–1249: As-Salih Ayyub
  - 1250–1250: Shajar al-Durr
  - 1250–1254: Al-Ashraf (last)
- History
  - Established by Saladin: 1171
  - Disestablished: 1260^{a}

Area
- 1190 est. (high-end estimate of peak area): 2,000,000 km^{2} (770,000 sq mi)
- 1200 est. (Low-end estimate of peak area): 1,700,000 km^{2} (660,000 sq mi)

Population
  - 12th century: 7,200,000 (estimate)^{c}
- Currency: Dinar, Dirham
Preceded by
| Fatimid Caliphate |
| Zengid dynasty |
| Kingdom of Jerusalem |
| Zurayids |
| Kingdom of Georgia |
| Shah-Armens |
| Artuqids |
Succeeded by
| Mamluk Sultanate |
| Rasulid dynasty |
| Emirate of Hasankeyf |
| Principality of Donboli |
| Emirate of Şirvan |
| Emirate of Kilis |
| Emirate of Bingöl |
- ^{a}The Ayyubids controlled the Levant until 1260 despite losing Egypt to the Mamluks in 1250. A branch of the Ayyubid dynasty ruled Hasankeyf until the early 16th century.^{b}For details of the languages spoken by the Ayyubid rulers and their subjects, see § Religion, ethnicity and language below.^{c}The total population of the Ayyubid territories is unknown. This population figure only includes Egypt, Syria, Upper Mesopotamia, Palestine, and Transjordan. Other Ayyubid territories, including coastal areas of Yemen, the Hejaz, Nubia and Cyrenaica are not included.

The Ayyubid dynasty (Arabic: الأيوبيون, romanized: al-Ayyūbīyūn), also known as the Ayyubid Sultanate, was a Sunni Muslim dynasty of Kurdish origin that founded the medieval Sultanate of Egypt, which was established by Saladin in 1171, following his abolition of the Fatimid Caliphate. Saladin had originally served the Zengid ruler Nur al-Din, leading the latter's army against the Crusaders in Fatimid Egypt, where he was made vizier. Following the death of his Zengid suzerain Nur al-Din in 1174, Saladin was proclaimed as the first Sultan of Egypt by the Abbasid Caliphate, and rapidly expanded the new sultanate beyond Egypt to encompass most of Syria, in addition to Hejaz, Yemen, northern Nubia, Tripolitania and Upper Mesopotamia. Saladin's military campaigns set the general borders and sphere of influence of the sultanate of Egypt for the almost 350 years of its existence. Most of the Crusader states fell to Saladin after his victory at the Battle of Hattin in 1187, but the Crusaders reconquered the Syrian coastlands in the 1190s.

After Saladin's death in 1193, his sons contested control of the sultanate, but Saladin's brother al-Adil ultimately became sultan in 1200. All of the later Ayyubid sultans of Egypt were his descendants. In the 1230s, the emirs of Syria attempted to assert their independence from Egypt and the Ayyubid realm remained divided until Sultan as-Salih Ayyub restored its unity by subduing most of Syria, except Aleppo, by 1247. By then, local Muslim dynasties had driven out the Ayyubids from Yemen, the Hejaz, and parts of Mesopotamia. After his death in 1249, as-Salih Ayyub was succeeded in Egypt by his son al-Mu'azzam Turanshah. However, the latter was soon overthrown by his Mamluk generals who had repelled a Crusader invasion of the Nile Delta. This effectively ended Ayyubid power in Egypt. Attempts by the emirs of Syria, led by an-Nasir Yusuf of Aleppo, to wrest back Egypt failed. In 1260, the Mongols sacked Aleppo and conquered the Ayyubids' remaining territories soon after. The Mamluks, who expelled the Mongols, maintained the Ayyubid principality of Hama until deposing its last ruler in 1341.

Despite their relatively short tenure, the Ayyubid dynasty had a transformative effect on the region, particularly Egypt. Under the Ayyubids, Egypt, which had previously been a formally Shi'a caliphate, became the dominant Sunni political and military force, and the economic and cultural centre of the region, a status that it would retain until it was conquered by the Ottomans in 1517. Throughout the sultanate, Ayyubid rule ushered in an era of economic prosperity, and the facilities and patronage provided by the Ayyubids led to a resurgence in intellectual activity in the Islamic world. This period was also marked by an Ayyubid process of vigorously strengthening Sunni Muslim dominance in the region by constructing numerous madrasas (Islamic schools of law) in their major cities.

== Name ==
Medieval and early modern sources often refer to the Ayyubids as Kurds, their state as Dawlat al-Akrād 'Kurdish state', and their sultans as mulūk al-Akrād 'Kurdish kings'. Among the earliest examples are an Arabic inscription from Mecca from the reign of al-ʿĀdil, recorded by Taqi al-Din al-Fasi, which calls the Ayyubids Kurdish kings. And the Zaydi imam al-Mansur, who in 1204 praised the Ayyubid conquerors of Yemen as 'Kurds who never bowed to a tyrant' (مِنَ الكُرْدِ لَمْ تَخضَعْ لِطَاغٍ وإِن عَلا). Minhaj al-Siraj Juzjani's Ṭabaqāt-i Nāṣirī includes the Ayyubids under the heading The Kurdiyyah kings, and the Armenian historian Hethum of Corycus described the transfer of Egypt to "the Medians called Kurds".

Mamluk work from 1475, Kitāb al-Ishāra fī l-Imāra wa-l-Wizāra wa-Tārīkh Dawlat al-Akrād.

Al-Khazraji's Tārīkh Dawlat al-Akrād 'the History of the Kurdish State', also given as Tārīkh Dawlat al-Akrād wa-l-Atrāk, uses Kurds for the Ayyubids and Turks for the Mamluks who succeeded them. An anonymous Mamluk chronicler titled his work Kitāb al-Ishāra fī l-Imāra wa-l-Wizāra wa-Tārīkh Dawlat al-Akrād, calling Saladin "the first of the Kurdish kings" and al-Ashraf "the last of the Kurdish kings in Egypt". Ibn Khaldun speaks of the Kurdish state that preceded the Mamluks, al-Maqrizi writes that the Kurds took over the kingdom of Egypt, and Ibn Iyas calls the reign of As-Salih Ayyub during the Seventh Crusade the Kurdish state. An Ottoman catalogue dedicated to the grand vizier Ibrahim Pasha refers to the Kurdish sultans of the Ayyubid state. Ottoman-era authors such as ʿAbd al-Qadir al-Tabari, Kâtip Çelebi and ʿAbd al-Ghani al-Nabulsi likewise call the Ayyubids Kurdish kings or the Kurdish state. The dynasty is also referred to as Ayyubid Kurds and "Kurdish rulers of Egypt".

== History ==
=== Origins ===
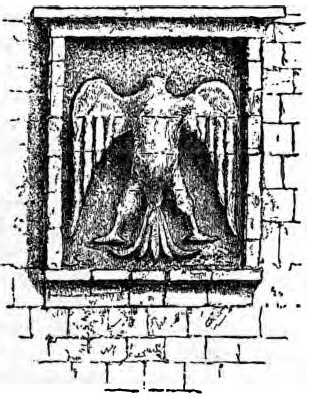
Late 19th-century sketch of the "Eagle of Saladin" on the walls of the Cairo Citadel, Egypt. It was historically described as having two heads, now missing. It is commonly identified as Saladin's emblem, though historical sources do not confirm this.

The progenitor of the Ayyubid dynasty, Najm ad-Din Ayyub ibn Shadhi, belonged to the Kurdish Rawadiya, a branch of the Hadhbani tribe. According to Iranica, the Rawadiya were originally of Arab descent and became Kurdicized over time. In later periods, members of the Ayyubid dynasty sponsored genealogies showing that they were not Kurds, but rather descended from noble Arab lineages, including the Banu Umayya. While these genealogies are generally regarded as politically motivated constructions, the historian Vladimir Minorsky argued that they reflect an underlying historical reality. He suggested the Rawadiya Kurds to be descendants of the Arab general Rawwād al-Azdī, who governed Tabriz in the early 9th century, and whose lineage became Kurdicized in Azerbaijan. These groups later emerged as a principal clan within the Hadhbani confederation, with one branch eventually settling in Dvin, Armenia. According to this view, the later Arab genealogies of the Ayyubids preserve a genuine, though distant, memory of Arab origins. Hugh Kennedy notes that an Azdī Arab family called the Banū Rawwād settled in Azerbaijan in the early Abbasid period, but says it is not clear they were connected to the later Kurdish dynasty. Ismet Cheriff Vanly regarded them as two separate groups from different periods. Ibn Khallikan reported that historians agreed on the family's Kurdish origin, and that he found no source naming anyone before Shadhi, though an Ayyubid family member told him Shadhi was Marwan's son.

According to Yasser Tabbaa, an anthropologist specializing in medieval Islamic culture, the Ayyubid rulers who reigned in the late 12th-century were far removed from their Kurdish origins, and unlike their Seljuq predecessors and their Mamluk successors, they were firmly "Arabized". Arabic culture and language formed the main component of their identity instead of their Kurdish heritage.

Ayyub's ancestors settled in the town of Dvin, in northern Armenia. The Rawadiya were part of the political-military elite of the town. Circumstances became unfavorable in Dvin when Turks seized the town. Shadhi left with his two sons Ayyub and Asad ad-Din Shirkuh. His friend Mujahid ad-Din Bihruz—the military governor of northern Mesopotamia under the Seljuks—welcomed him and appointed him governor of Tikrit. After Shadhi's death, Ayyub succeeded him in governance of the city with the assistance of his brother Shirkuh. Together they managed the affairs of the city well, gaining them popularity from the local inhabitants. In the meantime, Imad ad-Din Zangi, the ruler of Mosul, was defeated by the Abbasids under Caliph al-Mustarshid and Bihruz. In his bid to escape the battlefield to Mosul via Tikrit, Zangi took shelter with Ayyub and sought his assistance in this task. Ayyub complied and provided Zangi and his companions boats to cross the Tigris River and safely reach Mosul.

As a consequence for assisting Zangi, the Abbasid authorities sought punitive measures against Ayyub. Simultaneously, in a separate incident, Shirkuh killed a close confidant of Bihruz on charges that he had sexually assaulted a woman in Tikrit. The Abbasid court issued arrest warrants for both Ayyub and Shirkuh, but before the brothers could be arrested, they departed Tikrit for Mosul in 1138. When they arrived in Mosul, Zangi provided them with all the facilities they needed and he recruited the two brothers into his service. Ayyub was made commander of Ba'albek and Shirkuh entered the service of Zangi's son, Nur ad-Din. According to historian Abdul Ali, it was under the care and patronage of Zangi that the Ayyubid family rose to prominence.

=== Establishment in Egypt ===
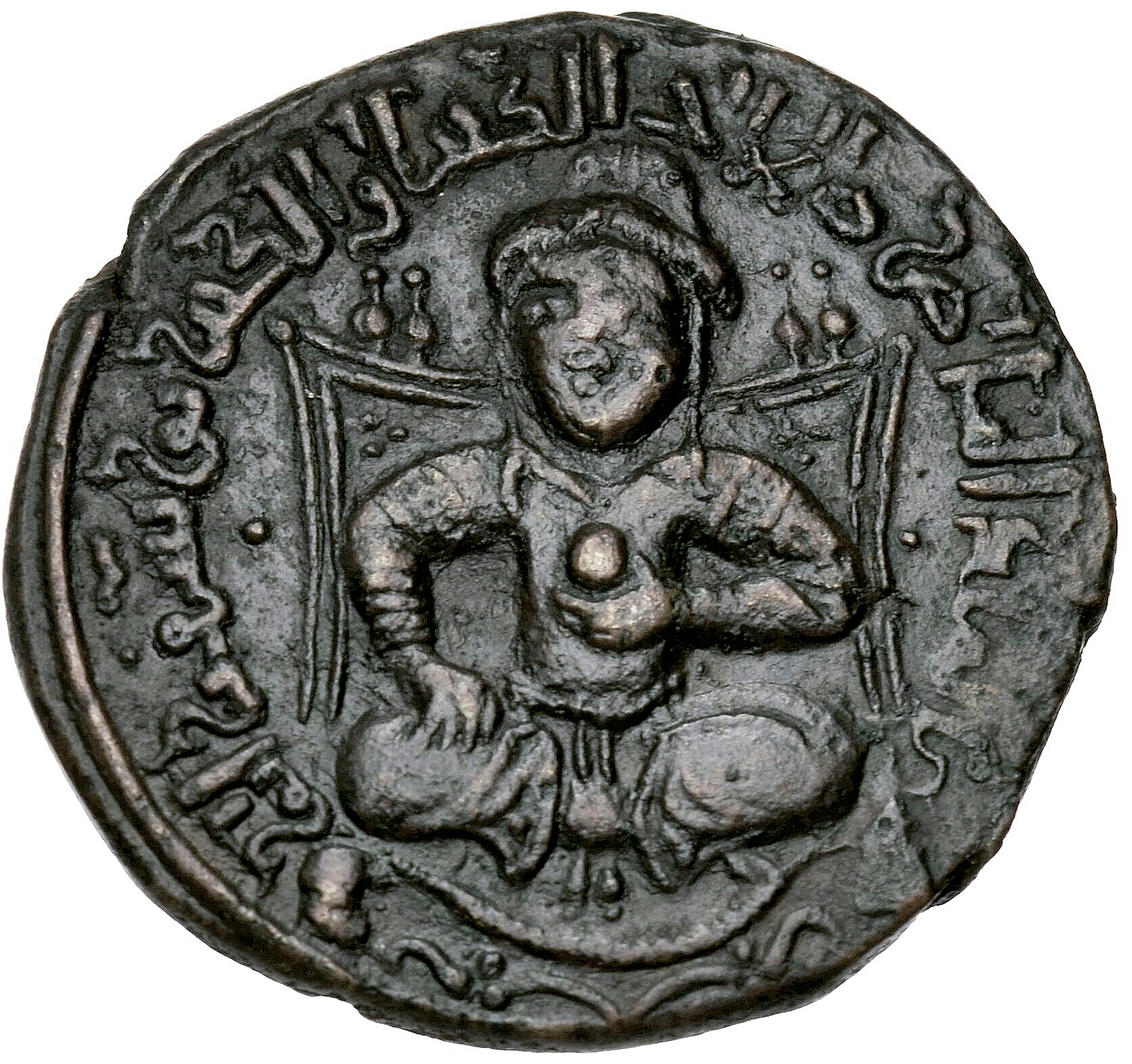
A dirham in the name of Saladin, dated 587 AH (1190/91 CE). Saladin is shown wearing the Seljuk Turk sharbush hat, his rallying sign. Legend "The Victorious King, Righteousness of the World and the Faith, Yusuf ibn Ayyub".

In 1164, Nur al-Din dispatched Shirkuh to lead an expeditionary force to prevent the Crusaders from establishing a strong presence in an increasingly anarchic Egypt. Shirkuh enlisted Ayyub's son, Saladin, as an officer under his command. They successfully drove out Dirgham, the vizier of Egypt, and reinstated his predecessor Shawar. After being reinstated, Shawar ordered Shirkuh to withdraw his forces from Egypt, but Shirkuh refused, claiming it was Nur al-Din's will that he remain. Over the course of several years, Shirkuh and Saladin defeated the combined forces of the Crusaders and Shawar's troops, first at Bilbais, then at a site near Giza, and in Alexandria, where Saladin would stay to protect while Shirkuh pursued Crusader forces in Lower Egypt.

Shawar died in 1169 and Shirkuh became vizier, but he too died later that year. After Shirkuh's death, Saladin was appointed vizier by the Fatimid caliph al-Adid because there was "no one weaker or younger" than Saladin, and "not one of the emirs obeyed him or served him", according to medieval Muslim chronicler Ibn al-Athir. Saladin soon found himself more independent than ever before in his career, much to the dismay of Nur al-Din who attempted to influence events in Egypt. He permitted Saladin's elder brother, Turan-Shah, to supervise Saladin in a bid to cause dissension within the Ayyubid family and thus undermining its position in Egypt. Nur al-Din satisfied Saladin's request that he be joined by his father Ayyub. However, Ayyub was sent primarily to ensure that Abbasid suzerainty was proclaimed in Egypt, which Saladin was reluctant to undertake due to his position as the vizier of the Fatimids. Although Nur al-Din failed to provoke the Ayyubids into rivalry, the extended Ayyubid family, particularly a number of local governors in Syria, did not entirely back Saladin.

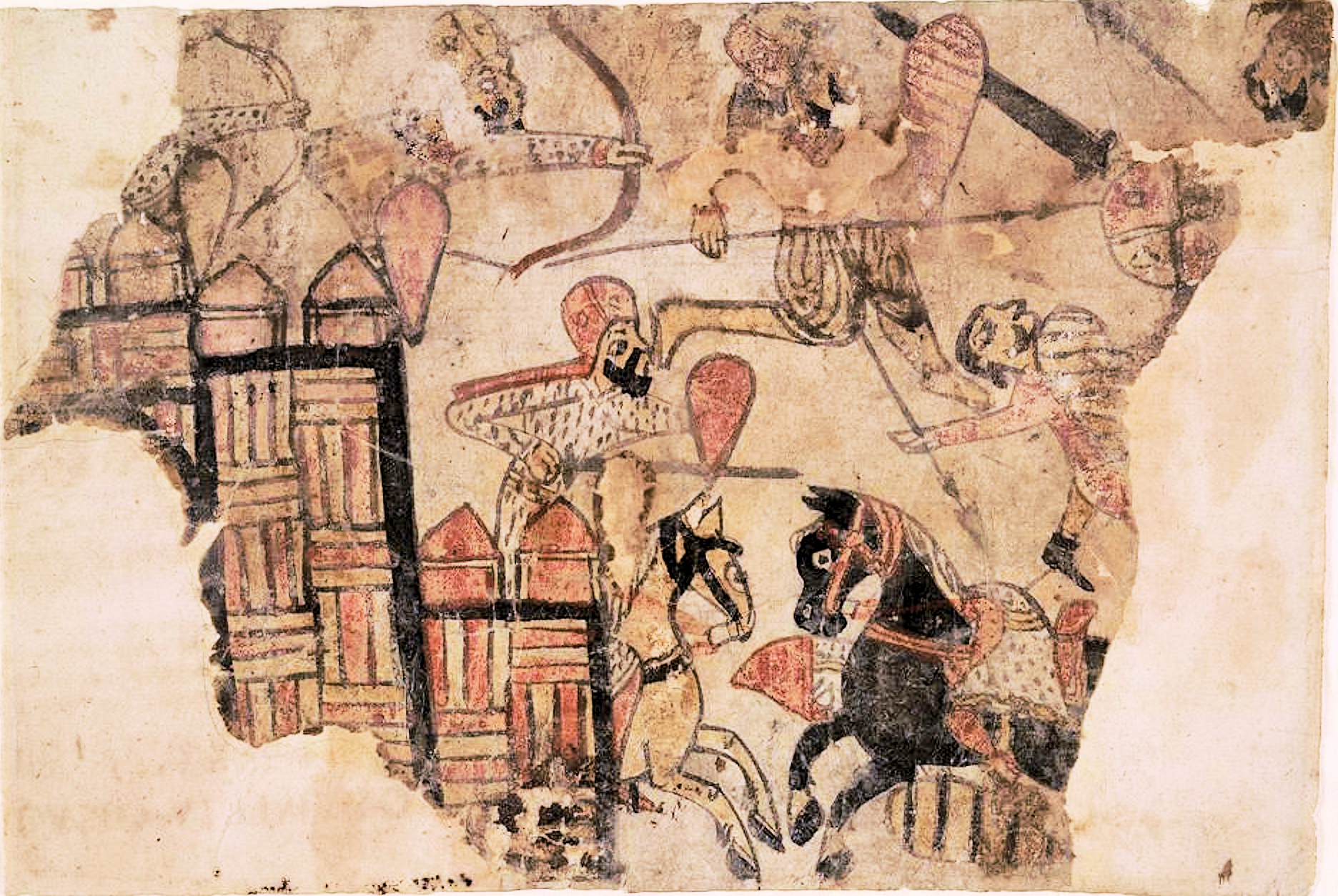
Fatimid or Ayyubid dynasty battle scene, Fustat, Cairo, Egypt, 12–13th century

Saladin consolidated his control in Egypt after ordering Turan-Shah to put down a revolt in Cairo staged by the Fatimid army's 50,000-strong Nubian regiments. After this success, Saladin began granting his family members high-ranking positions in the country and increased Sunni Muslim influence in Shia Muslim-dominated Cairo by ordering the construction of a college for the Maliki school of jurisprudence of Sunni Islam in the city, and another for the Shafi'i school, to which he belonged, in al-Fustat. In 1171, al-Adid died and Saladin took advantage of this power vacuum, effectively taking control of the country. Upon seizing power, he switched Egypt's allegiance to the Baghdad-based Abbasid Caliphate which adhered to Sunni Islam.

=== Expansion ===
==== Conquest of North Africa and Nubia ====
Saladin went to Alexandria in 1171–72 and found himself facing the dilemma of having many supporters in the city, but little money. A family council was held there by the Ayyubid emirs of Egypt where it was decided that al-Muzaffar Taqi al-Din Umar, Saladin's nephew, would launch an expedition against the coastal region of Barqa (Cyrenaica) west of Egypt with a force of 500 cavalry. To justify the raid, a letter was sent to the Bedouin tribes of Barqa, rebuking them for their robberies of travelers and ordering them to pay the alms-tax (zakat). The latter was to be collected from their livestock.

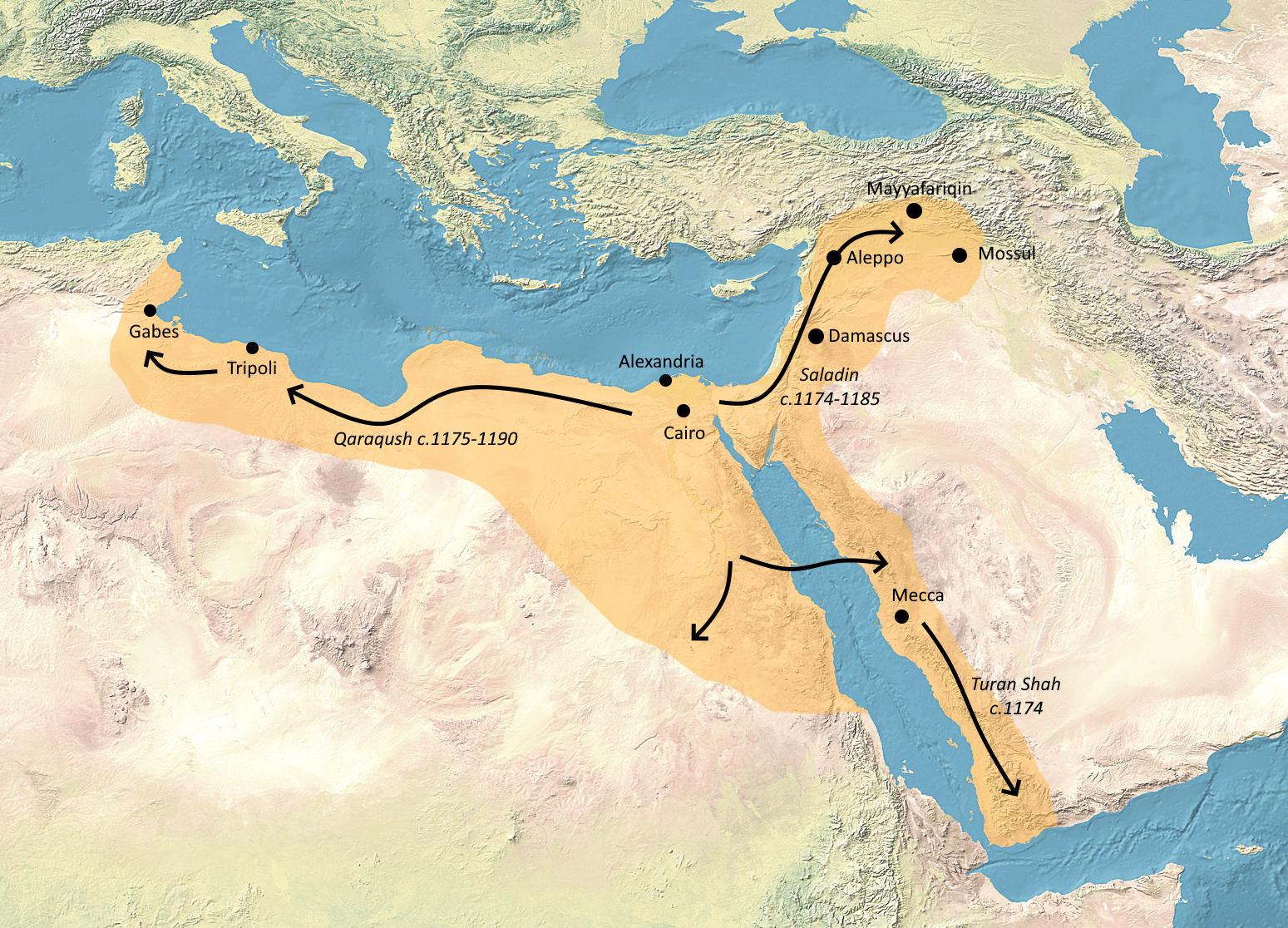
Ayyubid expansion 1174–1193, including the campaigns of Saladin, Qaranqush and Turan-Shah

In late 1172, Aswan was besieged by former Fatimid soldiers from Nubia and the governor of the city, Kanz al-Dawla—a former Fatimid loyalist—requested reinforcements from Saladin who complied. The reinforcements had come after the Nubians had already departed Aswan, but Ayyubid forces led by Turan-Shah advanced and conquered northern Nubia after capturing the town of Ibrim. Turan-Shah and his Kurdish soldiers temporarily lodged there. From Ibrim, they raided the surrounding region, halting their operations after being presented with an armistice proposal from the Makurian king. Although Turan-Shah's initial response was hawkish, he later sent an envoy to Dongola, who upon returning, described the poverty of the city and of Nubia in general to Turan-Shah. Consequently, the Ayyubids, like their Fatimid predecessors, were discouraged from further southward expansion into Nubia due to the poverty of the region, but required Nubia to guarantee the protection of Aswan and Upper Egypt. The Ayyubid garrison in Ibrim withdrew to Egypt in 1175.

Throughout the 1170s, the Ayyubids continued to push west as well. Sharaf al-Din Qaraqush, a commander under al-Muzaffar Taqi al-Din Umar, led most of these expeditions on the frontier. He captured Siwa in 1172 and conquered Cyrenaica before 1174. He subsequently conquered Tripoli with an army of Turks and Kurds, joined by Arab troops from some of the region's Bedouin tribes. The exact date of Tripoli's capture is uncertain, but happened sometime in the 1170s or early 1180s. While some Ayyubid forces fought the Crusaders in the Levant, Qaraqush's forces went on to capture most of Ifriqiya (present-day Tunisia) from the Almohads by 1185–1186. By this point, Qaraqush had also entered into alliance with the Banu Ghaniya, led by Ali ibn Ghaniya, another enemy of the Almohads. The Almohad caliph Yaqub al-Mansur reconquered Ifriqiya from 1187 to 1188, defeating both of them. The Ayyubids made no further attempts to intervene in the Maghreb after this.

==== Conquest of Arabia ====
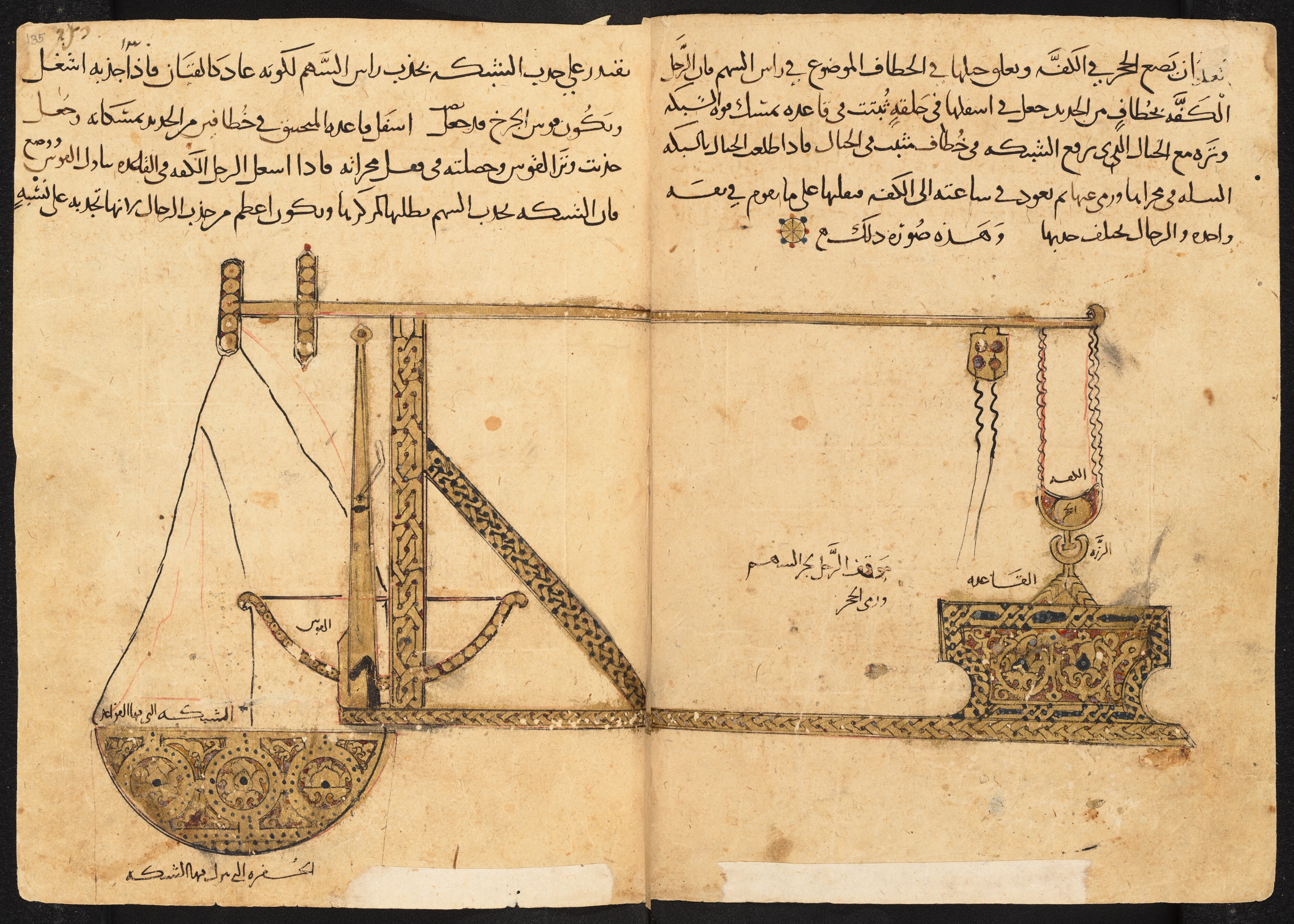
Arabic trebuchet, with its counterweight, in the Tabṣira by Murḍi Ibn cālī Ibn Murḍi al-Ṭarsūsī written for Saladin, late Fāṭimid or early Ayyūbid Egypt, c.1170 CE (Ms. Hunt.264, f.117, Bodleian Library, Oxford, UK). This is the only manuscript directly attributable to the Ayyubids, although early manuscripts such as the Kalīla wa-Dimna (BNF Arabe 3465) are also generally considered as Ayyubid.

In 1173, Saladin sent Turan-Shah to conquer Yemen and the Hejaz. Muslim writers Ibn al-Athir and later al-Maqrizi wrote that the reasoning behind the conquest of Yemen was an Ayyubid fear that should Egypt fall to Nur al-Din, they could seek refuge in a faraway territory. In May 1174, Turan-Shah conquered Zabid and later that year captured Aden. Aden became the principal maritime port of the dynasty in the Indian Ocean and the principal city of Yemen, although the official capital of Ayyubid Yemen was Taiz. The advent of the Ayyubids marked the beginning of a period of renewed prosperity in the city which saw the improvement of its commercial infrastructure, the establishment of new institutions, and the minting of its own coins. Following this prosperity, the Ayyubids implemented a new tax which was collected by galleys.

Turan-Shah drove out the remaining Hamdanid rulers of Sanaa, conquering the mountainous city in 1175. With the conquest of Yemen, the Ayyubids developed a coastal fleet, al-asakir al-bahriyya, which they used to guard the sea coasts under their control and protect them from pirate raids. The conquest held great significance for Yemen because the Ayyubids managed to unite the previous three independent states (Zabid, Aden, and Sanaa) under a single power. However, when Turan-Shah was transferred from his governorship in Yemen in 1176, uprisings broke out in the territory and were not quelled until 1182 when Saladin assigned his other brother Tughtekin Sayf al-Islam as governor of Yemen. The Ayyubid na'ib (deputy governor) of Yemen, Uthman al-Zandjili, conquered the greater part of Hadramaut in 1180, upon Turan-Shah's return to Yemen.

From Yemen, as from Egypt, the Ayyubids aimed to dominate the Red Sea trade routes which Egypt depended on and so sought to tighten their grip over the Hejaz, where an important trade stop, Yanbu, was located. To favor trade in the direction of the Red Sea, the Ayyubids built facilities along the Red Sea-Indian Ocean trade routes to accompany merchants. The Ayyubids also aspired to back their claims of legitimacy within the Caliphate by having sovereignty over the Islamic holy cities of Mecca and Medina. The conquests and economic advancements undertaken by Saladin effectively established Egypt's hegemony in the region.

==== Conquest of Syria and Upper Mesopotamia ====
Although still nominally a vassal of Nur al-Din, Saladin adopted an increasingly independent foreign policy. This independence became more publicly pronounced after Nur al-Din's death in 1174. Thereafter, Saladin set out to conquer Syria from the Zengids; and on November 23 he was welcomed in Damascus by the governor of the city. By 1175, he had taken control of Hama and Homs but failed to take Aleppo after besieging it. Control of Homs was handed to the descendants of Shirkuh in 1179 and Hama was given to Saladin's nephew, al-Muzaffar Umar. Saladin's successes alarmed Emir Saif al-Din of Mosul, the head of the Zengids at the time, who regarded Syria as his family's estate and was angered that it was being usurped by a former servant of Nur al-Din. He mustered an army to confront Saladin near Hama. Although heavily outnumbered, Saladin and his veteran soldiers decisively defeated the Zengids. After his victory, Saladin proclaimed himself king and suppressed the name of as-Salih Ismail al-Malik (Nur al-Din's adolescent son) in Friday prayers and Islamic coinage, replacing it with his own name. The Abbasid caliph, al-Mustadi, graciously welcomed Saladin's assumption of power and gave him the title of "Sultan of Egypt and Syria".

In the spring of 1176, another major confrontation occurred between the Zengids and the Ayyubids, this time at the Sultan's Mound, 15 kilometres (9.3 mi) from Aleppo. Saladin again emerged victorious, but Saif al-Din managed to narrowly escape. The Ayyubids proceeded to conquer other Syrian cities in the north, namely Ma'arat al-Numan, A'zaz, Buza'a, and Manbij, but failed to capture Aleppo during a second siege. An agreement was laid out, however, whereby Gumushtigin, the governor of Aleppo, and his allies at Hisn Kayfa and Mardin, would recognize Saladin as the sovereign of the Ayyubids' possessions in Syria, while Saladin allowed for Gumushtigin and as-Salih al-Malik to continue their rule over Aleppo.

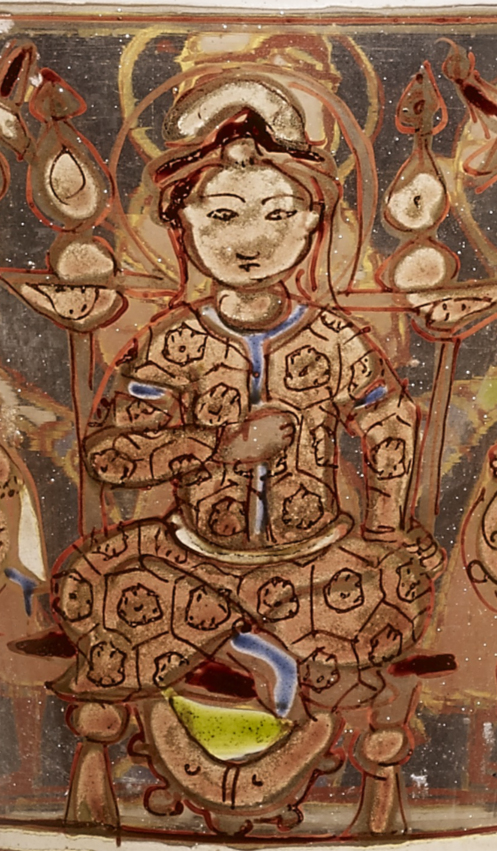
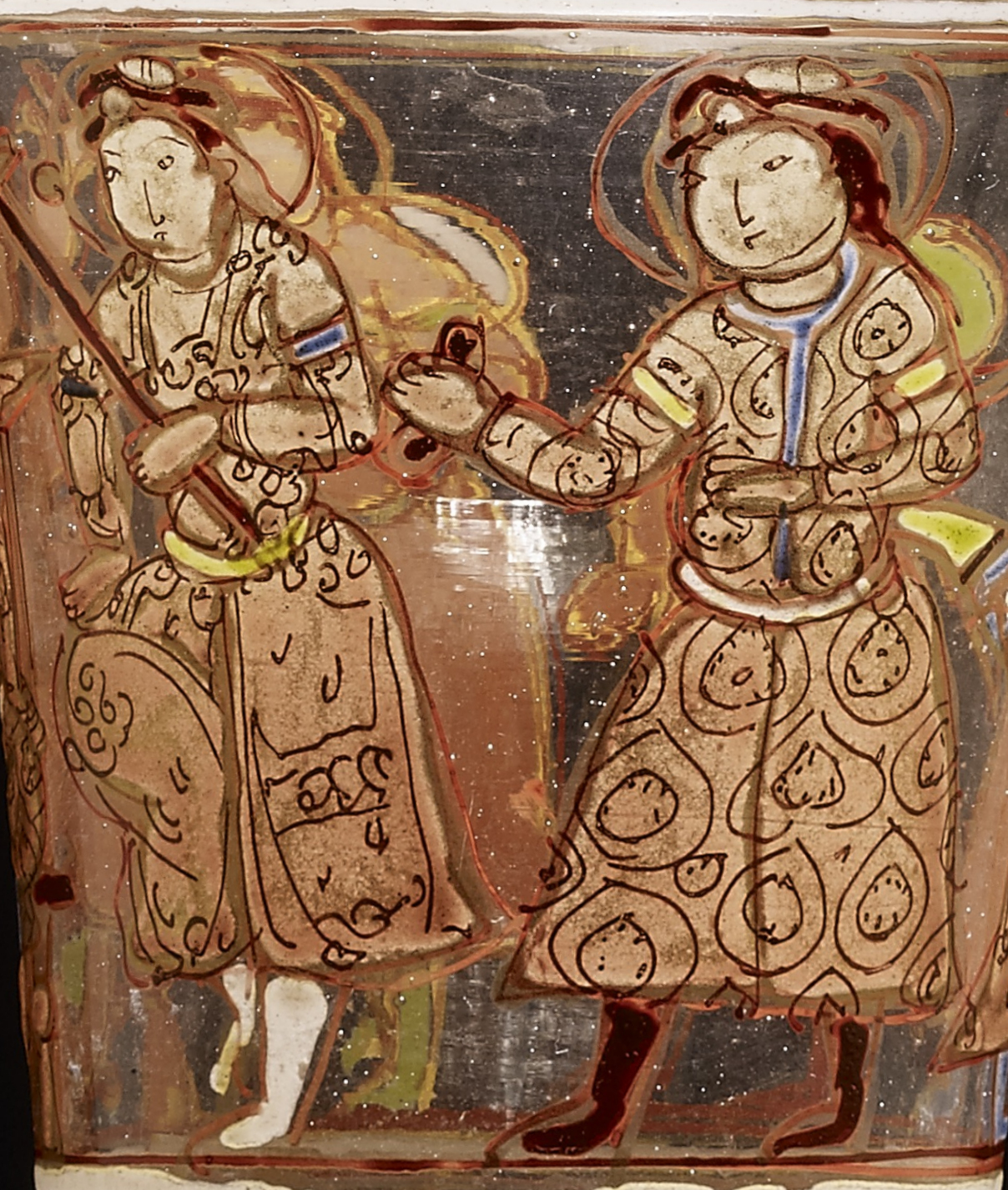
Northern Mesopotamian illustrative art at the time of Ayyubid control: the Palmer Cup (1200–1215). The ruler and attendants are similar to those found in the manuscript Kitab al-Dariyaq or metalworks from the Mosul or North Jazira area. They wear Seljuk-type clothes, together with the typical sharbush headgear.

While Saladin was in Syria, his brother al-Adil governed Egypt, and in 1174–75, Kanz al-Dawla of Aswan revolted against the Ayyubids with the intention of restoring Fatimid rule. His main backers were the local Bedouin tribes and the Nubians, but he also enjoyed the support of a multitude of other groups, including the Armenians. Coincidental or possibly in coordination, was an uprising by Abbas ibn Shadi who overran Qus along the Nile River in central Egypt. Both rebellions were crushed by al-Adil. For the rest of that year and throughout early 1176, Qaraqush continued his raids in western North Africa, bringing the Ayyubids into conflict with the Almohads who ruled the Maghreb.

In 1177, Saladin led a force of some 26,000 soldiers, according to Crusader chronicler William of Tyre, into southern Palestine after hearing that most of the Kingdom of Jerusalem's soldiers were besieging Harem, Syria west of Aleppo. Suddenly attacked by the Templars under Baldwin IV of Jerusalem near Ramla, the Ayyubid army was defeated at the Battle of Montgisard, with the majority of its troops killed. Saladin encamped at Homs the following year and a number of skirmishes between his forces, commanded by Farrukh Shah, and the Crusaders occurred. Undeterred, Saladin invaded the Crusader states from the west and defeated Baldwin at the Battle of Marj Ayyun in 1179. The following year, he destroyed the newly built Crusader castle of Chastellet at the Battle of Jacob's Ford. In the campaign of 1182, he sparred with Baldwin again in the inconclusive Battle of Belvoir Castle in Kawkab al-Hawa.

In May 1182, Saladin captured Aleppo after a brief siege; the new governor of the city, Imad al-Din Zangi II, had been unpopular with his subjects and surrendered Aleppo after Saladin agreed to restore Zangi II's previous control over Sinjar, Raqqa, and Nusaybin, which would thereafter serve as vassal territories of the Ayyubids. Aleppo formally entered Ayyubid hands on 12 June. The day after, Saladin marched to Harim, near the Crusader-held Antioch and captured the city when its garrison forced out their leader, Surhak, who was then briefly detained and released by al-Muzaffar Umar. The surrender of Aleppo and Saladin's allegiance with Zangi II had left Izz al-Din al-Mas'ud of Mosul the only major Muslim rival of the Ayyubids. Mosul had been subjected to a short siege in the autumn of 1182, but after mediation by the Abbasid caliph an-Nasir, Saladin withdrew his forces. Mas'ud attempted to align himself with the Artuqids of Mardin, but they became allies of Saladin instead. In 1183, Irbil too switched allegiance to the Ayyubids. Mas'ud then sought the support of Pahlawan ibn Muhammad, the governor of Azerbaijan, and although he did not usually intervene in the region, the possibility of Pahlawan's intervention made Saladin cautious about launching further attacks against Mosul.

An arrangement was negotiated whereby al-Adil was to administer Aleppo in the name of Saladin's son al-Afdal, while Egypt would be governed by al-Muzaffar Umar in the name of Saladin's other son Uthman. When the two sons were to come of age they would assume power in the two territories, but if any died, one of Saladin's brothers would take their place. In the summer of 1183, after ravaging eastern Galilee, Saladin's raids there culminated in the Battle of al-Fule in the Jezreel Valley between him and the Crusaders under Guy of Lusignan. The mostly hand-to-hand fighting ended indecisively. The two armies withdrew to a mile from each other and while the Crusaders discussed internal matters, Saladin captured the Golan Plateau, cutting the Crusaders off from their main supplies source. In October 1183 and then on 13 August 1184, Saladin and al-Adil besieged Crusader-held Karak, but were unable to capture it. Afterward, the Ayyubids raided Samaria, burning down Nablus. Saladin returned to Damascus in September 1184 and a relative peace between the Crusader states and the Ayyubid empire subsequently ensued in 1184–1185.

Saladin launched his last offensive against Mosul in late 1185, hoping for an easy victory over a presumably demoralized Mas'ud, but failed due to the city's unexpectedly stiff resistance and a serious illness which caused Saladin to withdraw to Harran. Upon Abbasid encouragement, Saladin and Mas'ud negotiated a treaty in March 1186 that left the Zengids in control of Mosul, but had to cede the eastern region beyond lesser Zab to Shahrizor to direct Ayyubid control, and under the obligation to supply the Ayyubids with military support when requested.

==== Conquest of Palestine and Transjordan ====
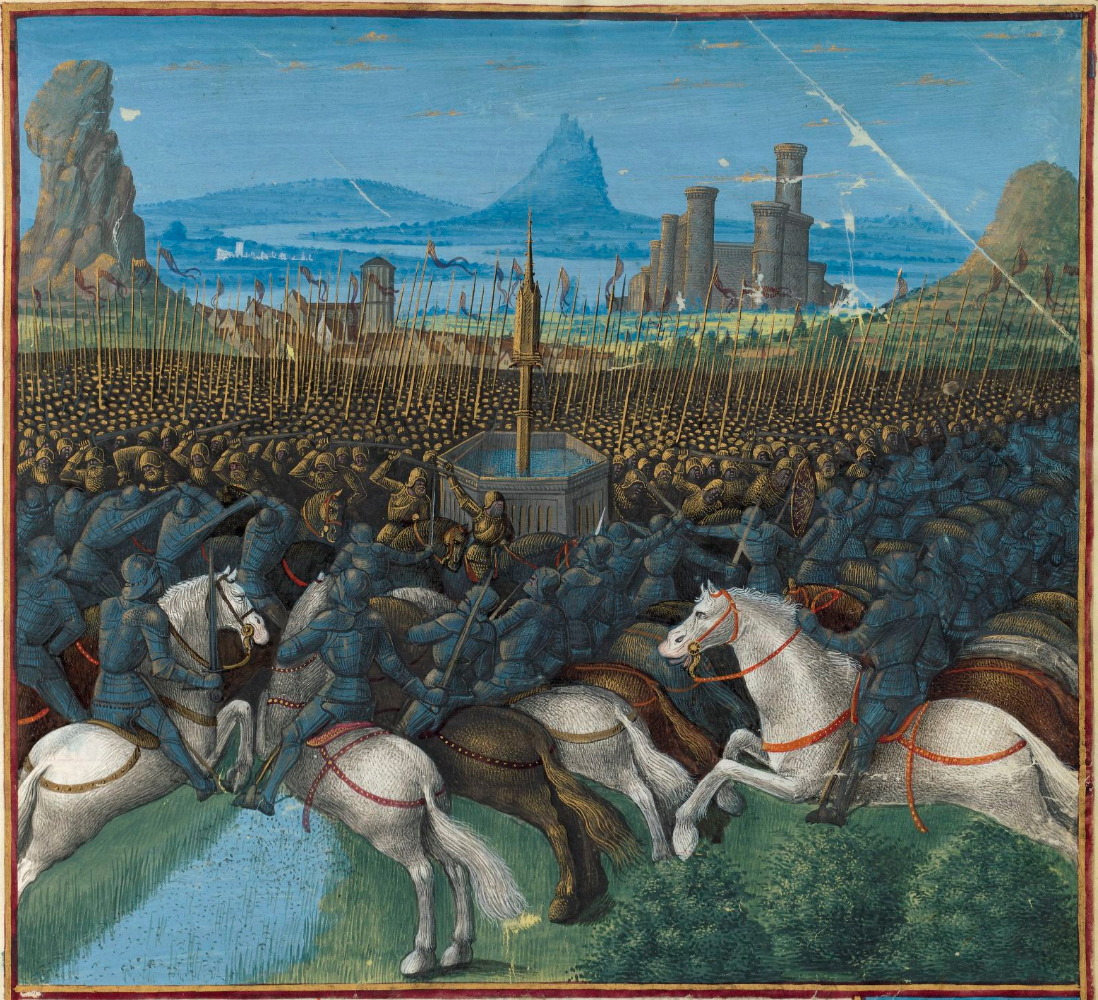
Virtually the entire Kingdom of Jerusalem passed into Ayyubid hands after their victory against the Crusaders in the Battle of Hattin in 1187; illustration from Les Passages faits Outremer par les Français contre les Turcs et autres Sarrasins et Maures outremarins, c. 1490.

Saladin besieged Tiberias in the eastern Galilee on 3 July 1187 and the Crusader army attempted to attack the Ayyubids by way of Kafr Kanna. After hearing of the Crusaders' march, Saladin led his guard back to their main camp at Kafr Sabt, leaving a small detachment at Tiberias. With a clear view of the Crusader army, Saladin ordered al-Muzaffar Umar to block the Crusaders' entry from Hattin by taking a position near Lubya, while Gökböri and his troops were stationed at a hill near al-Shajara. On 4 July the Crusaders advanced toward the Horns of Hattin and charged against the Muslim forces, but were overwhelmed and defeated decisively. Four days after the battle, Saladin invited al-Adil to join him in the reconquest of Palestine, Galilee and Lebanese coast. On 8 July the Crusader stronghold of Acre was captured by Saladin, while his forces seized Nazareth and Saffuriya; other brigades took Haifa, Caesarea, Sebastia and Nablus, while al-Adil conquered Mirabel and Jaffa. On 26 July, Saladin returned to the coast and received the surrender of Sarepta, Sidon, Beirut, and Jableh. In August, the Ayyubids conquered Ramla, Darum, Gaza, Bayt Jibrin, and Latrun. Ascalon was taken on 4 September. In September–October 1187, the Ayyubids besieged Jerusalem, taking possession of it on 2 October, after negotiations with Balian of Ibelin.

Karak and Mont Real in Transjordan soon fell, followed by Safad in the northeastern Galilee. By the end of 1187 the Ayyubids were in control of virtually the entire Crusader kingdom in the Levant with the exception of Tyre, which held out under Conrad of Montferrat. In December 1187, an Ayyubid army consisting of the garrisons of Saladin and his brothers from Aleppo, Hama, and Egypt besieged Tyre. Half of the Muslim naval fleet was seized by Conrad's forces on 29 December, followed by an Ayyubid defeat on the shoreline of the city. On 1 January 1188, Saladin held a war council where a withdrawal from Tripoli was agreed.

==== Third Crusade ====
Pope Gregory VIII called for a Third Crusade against the Muslims in early 1189. Frederick Barbarossa of the Holy Roman Empire, Philip Augustus of France, and Richard the Lionheart of England formed an alliance to reconquer Jerusalem. Meanwhile, the Crusaders and the Ayyubids fought near Acre that year and were joined by the reinforcements from Europe. From 1189 to 1191, Acre was besieged by the Crusaders, and despite initial Muslim successes, it fell to Crusader forces. A massacre of 2,700 Muslim prisoners of war ensued, and the Crusaders then made plans to take Ascalon in the south.

As the Ayyubids faced a Crusader naval blockade in Acre and a steady flow of Crusader reinforcements arriving by sea, Saladin sought assistance from the Almohads, who had one of the largest navies in the Mediterranean. In 1189–1190, he sent letters to Yaqub al-Mansur requesting naval support in Palestine, which the Almohad caliph declined. Various explanations for this refusal have been suggest by historians, including the Almohads' focus on al-Andalus, ideological differences between the two Muslim states, and the distrust caused by Qaraqush's invasion of Ifriqiya.

The Crusaders, now under the unified command of Richard, defeated Saladin at the Battle of Arsuf, allowing for the Crusader conquest of Jaffa and much of coastal Palestine, but they were unable to recover the interior regions. Instead, Richard signed a treaty with Saladin in 1192, restoring the Kingdom of Jerusalem to a coastal strip between Jaffa and Beirut. It was the last major war effort of Saladin's career, as he died the next year, in 1193.

=== Quarrels over the sultanate ===
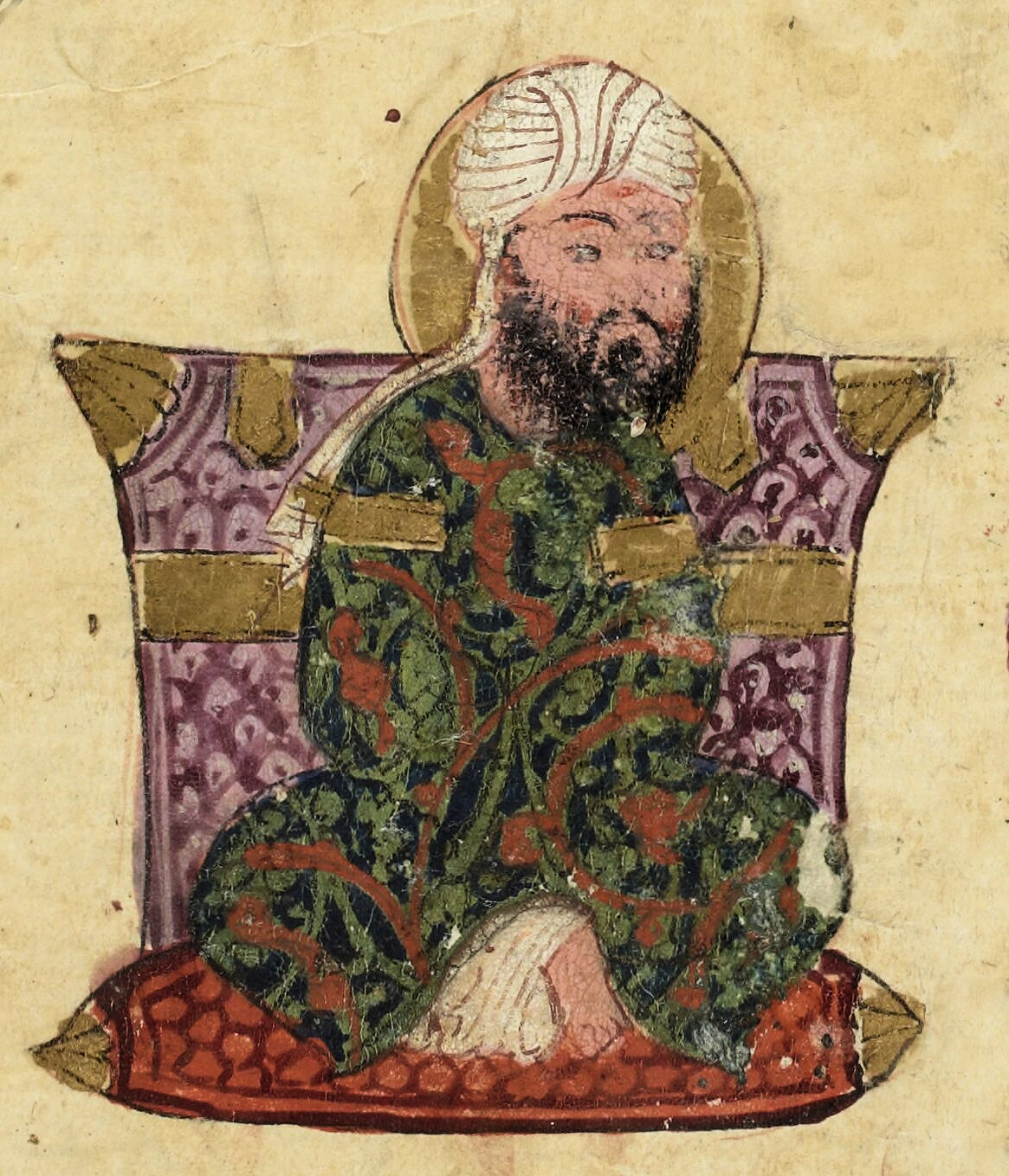
The Qadi of Alexandria in 1200–1210, according to the Maqamat al-Hariri (BNF 3929)

Rather than establishing a centralized empire, Saladin had established hereditary ownership throughout his lands, dividing his empire among his kinsmen, with family members presiding over semi-autonomous fiefs and principalities. Although these princes (emirs) owed allegiance to the Ayyubid sultan, they maintained relative independence in their own territories. Upon Saladin's death, az-Zahir took Aleppo from al-Adil per the arrangement and al-Aziz Uthman held Cairo, while his eldest son, al-Afdal retained Damascus, which also included Palestine and much of Mount Lebanon. Al-Adil then acquired al-Jazira (Upper Mesopotamia), where he held the Zengids of Mosul at bay. In 1193, Mas'ud of Mosul joined forces with Zangi II of Sinjar and together the Zengid coalition moved to conquer al-Jazira. However, before any major results could be achieved, Mas'ud fell ill and returned to Mosul, and al-Adil then compelled Zangi to make a quick peace before the Zengids suffered territorial losses at the hands of the Ayyubids. Al-Adil's son al-Mu'azzam took possession of Karak and Transjordan.

Soon, however, Saladin's sons squabbled over the division of the empire. Saladin had appointed al-Afdal to the governorship of Damascus with the intention that his son should continue to see the city as his principal place of residence to emphasize the primacy of the jihad (struggle) against the Crusader states. Al-Afdal, however, found that his attachment to Damascus contributed to his undoing. Several of his father's subordinate emirs left the city for Cairo to lobby Uthman to oust him on claims he was inexperienced and intended to oust the Ayyubid old guard. Al-Adil further encouraged Uthman to act in order prevent al-Afdal's incompetence putting the Ayyubid empire in jeopardy. Thus, in 1194, Uthman openly demanded the sultanate. Uthman's claim to the throne was settled in a series of assaults on Damascus in 1196, forcing al-Afdal to leave for a lesser post at Salkhad. Al-Adil established himself in Damascus as a lieutenant of Uthman, but wielded great influence within the empire.

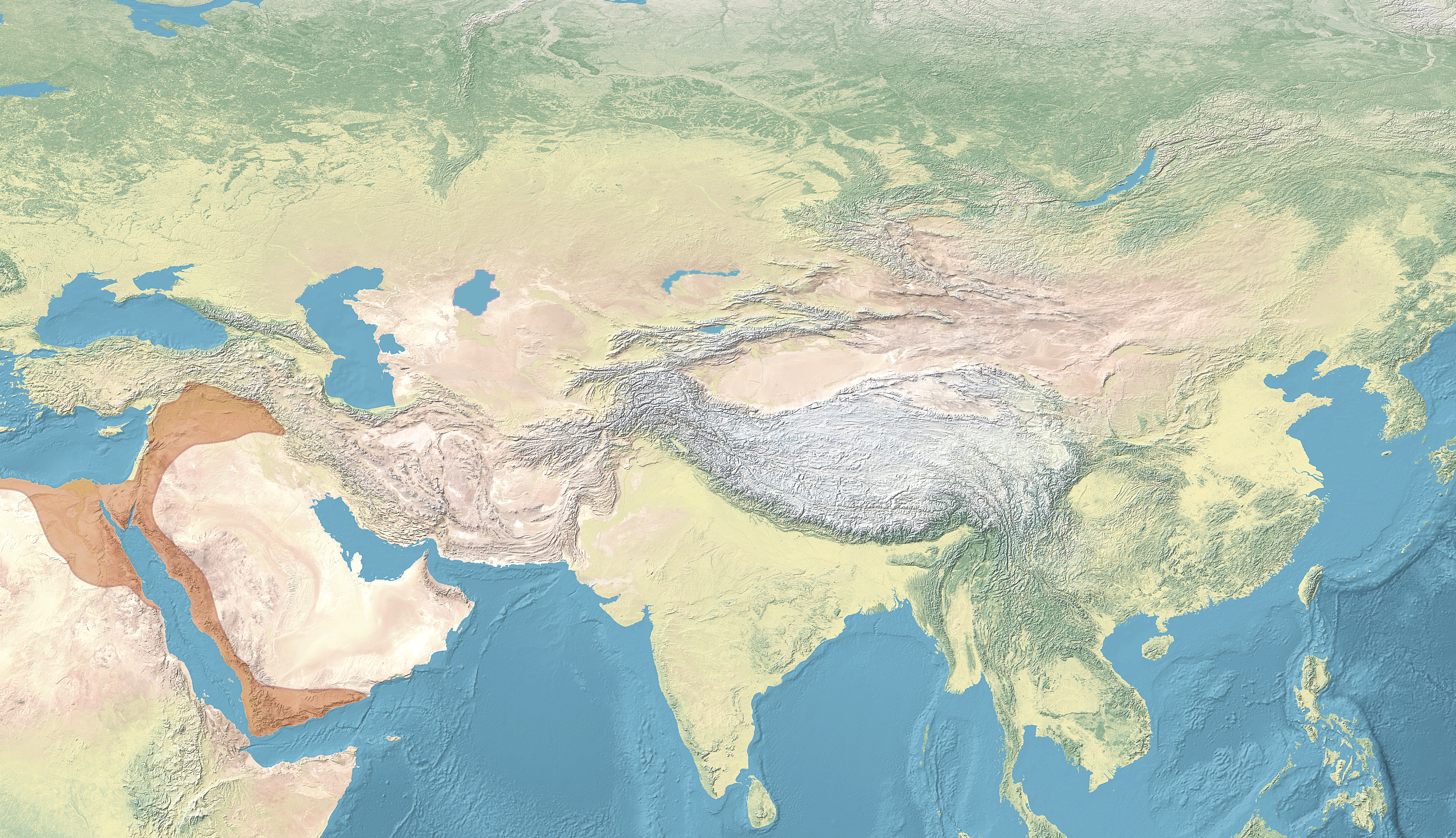
The Ayyubid and contemporary Asian polities c. 1215

When Uthman died in a hunting accident near Cairo, al-Afdal was again made sultan (although Uthman's son al-Mansur was the nominal ruler of Egypt), al-Adil having been absent in a campaign in the northeast. Al-Adil returned and managed to occupy the Citadel of Damascus, but then faced a strong assault from the combined forces of al-Afdal and his brother az-Zahir of Aleppo. These forces disintegrated under al-Afdal's leadership and in 1200, al-Adil resumed his offensive. Upon Uthman's death, two clans of mamluks (slave soldiers) entered into conflict. They were the Asadiyya and Salahiyya, both of which Shirkuh and Saladin had purchased. The Salahiyya backed al-Adil in his struggles against al-Afdal. With their support, al-Adil conquered Cairo in 1200, and forced al-Afdal to accept internal banishment. He proclaimed himself Sultan of Egypt and Syria afterward and entrusted the governance of Damascus to al-Mu'azzam and al-Jazira to his other son al-Kamil. Also around 1200, a sharif (tribal head related to the Islamic prophet Muhammad), Qatada ibn Idris, seized power in Mecca and was recognized as the emir of the city by al-Adil.

Al-Afdal attempted unsuccessfully to take Damascus his final time. Al-Adil entered the city in triumph in 1201. Thereafter, al-Adil's line, rather than Saladin's line, dominated the next 50 years of Ayyubid rule. However, az-Zahir still held Aleppo and al-Afdal was given Samosata in Anatolia. Al-Adil redistributed his possessions between his sons: al-Kamil was to succeed him in Egypt, al-Ashraf received al-Jazira, and al-Awhad was given Diyar Bakr, but the latter territory shifted to al-Ashraf's domain after al-Awhad died.

Al-Adil aroused open hostility from the Hanbali lobby in Damascus for largely ignoring the Crusaders, having launched only one campaign against them. Al-Adil believed that the Crusader army could not be defeated in a direct fight. Prolonged campaigns also involved the difficulties of maintaining a coherent Muslim coalition. The trend under al-Adil was the steady growth of the empire, mainly through the expansion of Ayyubid authority in al-Jazira and incorporation of Shah-Armen domains (in eastern Anatolia). The Abbasids eventually recognized al-Adil's role as sultan in 1207.

By 1208 Kingdom of Georgia challenged Ayyubid rule in eastern Anatolia and besieged Khilat (possessions of al-Awhad). In response al-Adil assembled and personally led large Muslim army that included the emirs of Homs, Hama and Baalbek as well as contingents from other Ayyubid principalities to support al-Awhad. During the siege, Georgian general Ivane Mkhargrdzeli accidentally fell into the hands of the al-Awhad on the outskirts of Khilat and was released in 1210, only after the Georgians agreed to sign a Thirty Years' Truce. The truce ended the Georgian menace to Ayyubid Armenia, leaving the Lake Van region to the Ayyubids of Damascus.

A Crusader military campaign was launched on 3 November 1217, beginning with an offensive towards Transjordan. Al-Mu'azzam urged al-Adil to launch a counter-attack, but he rejected his son's proposal. In 1218, the fortress of Damietta in the Nile Delta was besieged by the Crusaders. After two failed attempts, the fortress eventually capitulated on 25 August. Six days later al-Adil died of apparent shock at Damietta's loss.

Al-Kamil proclaimed himself sultan in Cairo, while his brother al-Mu'azzam claimed the throne in Damascus. Al-Kamil attempted to retake Damietta, but was forced back by John of Brienne. After learning of a conspiracy against him, he fled, leaving the Egyptian army leaderless. Panic ensued, but with the help of al-Mu'azzam, al-Kamil regrouped his forces. By then, however, the Crusaders had seized his camp. The Ayyubids offered to negotiate for a withdrawal from Damietta, offering the restoration of Palestine to the Kingdom of Jerusalem, with the exception of the forts of Mont Real and Karak. This was refused by the leader of the Fifth Crusade, Pelagius of Albano, and in 1221, the Crusaders were driven out of the Nile Delta after the Ayyubid victory at Mansura.

=== Disintegration ===
==== Loss of territories and ceding of Jerusalem ====
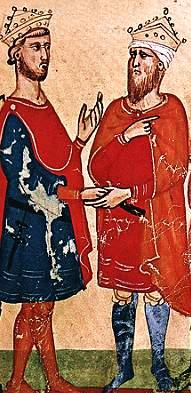
Al-Kamil (right) and Frederick II signed a treaty restoring Jerusalem to the Crusaders for ten years; from Nuova Cronica, mid-14th century

In the east, the Khwarazmian Empire under Jalal al-Din Mangburni captured the town of Khilat from al-Ashraf, while the traditionally loyalist Rasulids began to encroach on Ayyubid holdings in Arabia. In 1222 the Ayyubids appointed the Rasulid leader Ali ibn Rasul as governor of Mecca. Ayyubid rule in Yemen and the Hejaz was declining and the Ayyubid governor of Yemen, Mas'ud ibn Kamil, was forced to leave for Egypt in 1223. He appointed Nur ad-Din Umar as his deputy governor while he was absent. In 1224 a local dynasty gained control of Hadramaut from the Ayyubids, whose control of it had been weakened due to their troubled situation in Yemen proper. Following Mas'ud ibn Kamil's death in 1229, Nur ad-Din Umar declared his independence and discontinued the annual tribute payment to the Ayyubids in Egypt.

Under Frederick II, a Sixth Crusade was launched, capitalizing on the ongoing strife between al-Kamil of Egypt and al-Mu'azzam of Syria. Subsequently, al-Kamil offered Jerusalem to Frederick to help prevent a Syrian invasion of Egypt, but Frederick refused. Al-Kamil's position was strengthened when al-Mu'azzam died in 1227 and was succeeded by his son an-Nasir Dawud. Al-Kamil continued negotiations with Frederick in Acre in 1228, leading to a truce signed in February 1229. The agreement gave the Crusaders control over an unfortified Jerusalem for over ten years, but also guaranteed Muslim control over Islamic holy places in the city. Although the treaty held little military significance, an-Nasir Dawud used it as a pretext to provoke the sentiments of Syria's inhabitants. A Friday sermon by a popular preacher at the Umayyad Mosque "reduced the crowd to violent sobbing and tears".

The settlement with the Crusaders was accompanied by a proposed redistribution of the Ayyubid principalities whereby Damascus and its territories would by governed by al-Ashraf, who recognized al-Kamil's sovereignty. An-Nasir Dawud resisted, incensed by the Ayyubid-Crusader truce. Al-Kamil's forces reached Damascus to enforce the proposed agreement in May 1229. The ensuing siege levied significant pressure on the inhabitants, but they rallied to an-Nasir Dawud, having been supportive of his father's stable rule and angered at the treaty with Frederick. After one month, an-Nasir Dawud sued for peace and was granted a new principality, centered around Karak, while al-Ashraf, the governor of Diyar Bakr, assumed the governorship of Damascus.

Meanwhile, the Seljuks were advancing towards al-Jazira. The descendants of Qatada ibn Idris challenged Ayyubid rule in Mecca. The Rasulids took advantage of this to end Ayyubid suzerainty in the Hejaz and bring the region under their control, which they accomplished in 1238 when Nur al-Din Umar captured Mecca.

==== Syro-Egyptian divide ====
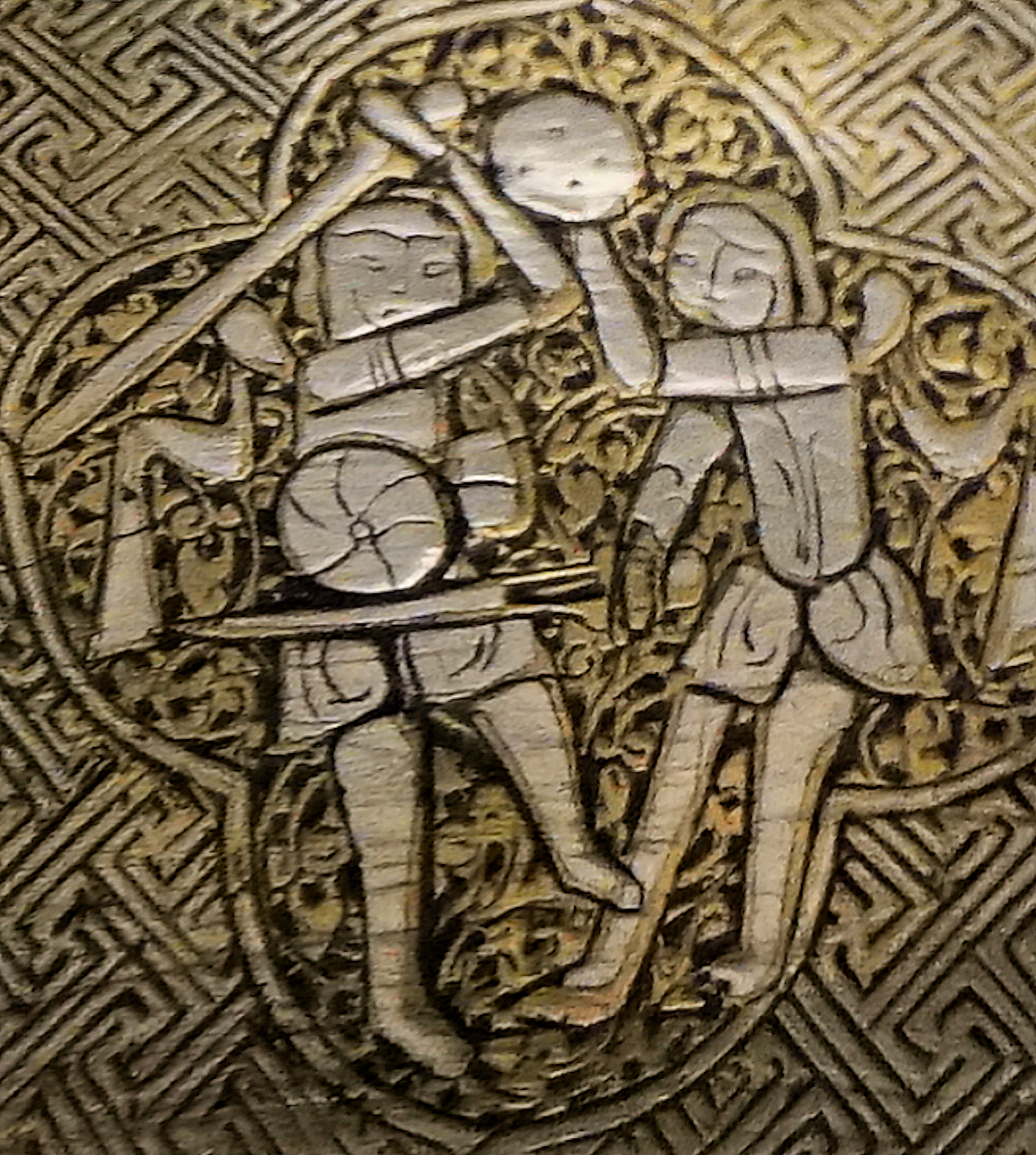
Basin of Ayubbid Sultan Al-Adil II, Syria, 1238–1240, combat scene.

Al-Ashraf's rule in Damascus was stable, but he and the other emirs of Syria sought to assert their independence from Cairo. Amid these tensions, al-Ashraf died in August 1237 after a four-month illness and was succeeded by his brother as-Salih Ismail. Two months later, al-Kamil's Egyptian army arrived and besieged Damascus, but as-Salih Ismail had destroyed the suburbs of the city to deny al-Kamil's forces shelter. In 1232, al-Kamil installed his eldest son as-Salih Ayyub to govern Hisn Kayfa, but upon al-Kamil's death in 1238, as-Salih Ayyub disputed the proclamation of younger brother al-Adil II as sultan in Cairo. As-Salih Ayyub eventually occupied Damascus in December 1238, but his uncle Ismail retrieved the city in September 1239. Ismail's cousin an-Nasir Dawud had Ismail detained in Karak in a move to prevent the latter's arrest by al-Adil II. Ismail entered into an alliance with Dawud who released him the following year, allowing him to proclaim himself sultan in place of al-Adil II in May 1240.

Throughout the early 1240s, as-Salih Ayyub carried out reprisals against those who supported al-Adil II, and he then quarreled with an-Nasir Dawud who had reconciled with as-Salih Ismail of Damascus. The rival sultans as-Salih Ayyub and Ismail attempted to ally with the Crusaders against the other. In 1244, the breakaway Ayyubids of Syria allied with the Crusaders and confronted the coalition of as-Salih Ayyub and the Khwarizmids at Hirbiya, near Gaza. A large battle ensued, resulting in a major victory for as-Salih Ayyub and the virtual collapse of the Kingdom of Jerusalem.

==== Restoration of unity ====
In 1244–1245, as-Salih Ayyub had seized the area approximate to the modern-day West Bank from an-Nasir Dawud; he gained possession of Jerusalem, then marched on to take Damascus, which fell with relative ease in October 1245. Shortly afterward, Sayf al-Din Ali surrendered his exposed principality of Ajlun and its fortress to as-Salih Ayyub. The rupture of the alliance between the Khwarizmids and as-Salih Ayyub ended with the virtual destruction of the former by al-Mansur Ibrahim, the Ayyubid emir of Homs, in October 1246. With the Khwarizimid defeat, as-Salih Ayyub was able to complete the conquest of southern Syria. His general Fakhr ad-Din went on to subdue an-Nasir Dawud's territories. He sacked the lower town of Karak, then besieged its fortress. A stalemate followed with neither an-Nasir Dawud or Fakhr ad-Din strong enough to dislodge the other's forces. A settlement was eventually reached whereby an-Nasir Dawud would retain the fortress, but cede the remainder of his principality to as-Salih Ayyub. Having settled the situation in Palestine and Transjordan, Fakhr ad-Din moved north and marched to Bosra, the last place still held by Ismail. During the siege, Fakhr ad-Din fell ill, but his commanders continued the assault against the city, which fell in December 1246.

By May 1247, as-Salih Ayyub was master of Syria south of Lake Homs, having gained control over Banyas and Salkhad. With his fellow Ayyubid opponents subdued, except for Aleppo under an-Nasir Yusuf, as-Salih Ayyub undertook a limited offensive against the Crusaders, sending Fakhr ad-Din to move against their territories in the Galilee. Tiberias fell on 16 June, followed by Mount Tabor and Kawkab al-Hawa soon thereafter. Safad with its Templar fortress seemed out of reach, so the Ayyubids marched south to Ascalon. Facing stubborn resistance from the Crusader garrison, an Egyptian flotilla was sent by as-Salih Ayyub to support the siege and on 24 October, Fakhr ad-Din's troops stormed through a breach in the walls and killed or captured the entire garrison. The city was razed and left deserted.

As-Salih Ayyub returned to Damascus to keep an eye on developments in northern Syria. Al-Ashraf Musa of Homs had ceded the important stronghold of Salamiyah to as-Salih Ayyub the previous winter, perhaps to underline their patron-client relationship. This troubled the Ayyubids of Aleppo who feared it would be used as a base for a military take-over of their city. An-Nasir Yusuf found this intolerable and decided to annex Homs in the winter of 1248. The city surrendered in August and an-Nasir Yusuf's terms forced al-Ashraf Musa to hand over Homs, but he was allowed to retain nearby Palmyra and Tell Bashir in the Syrian Desert. As-Salih Ayyub sent Fakhr ad-Din to recapture Homs, but Aleppo countered by sending an army to Kafr Tab, south of the city. An-Nasir Dawud left Karak for Aleppo to support an-Nasir Yusuf, but in his absence, his brothers al-Amjad Hasan and az-Zahir Shadhi detained his heir al-Mu'azzam Isa and then personally went to as-Salih Ayyub's camp at al-Mansourah in Egypt to offer him control of Karak in return for holdings in Egypt. As-Salih Ayyub agreed and sent the eunuch Badr al-Din Sawabi to act as his governor in Karak.

=== Fall ===
==== Rise of the Mamluks and fall of Egypt ====
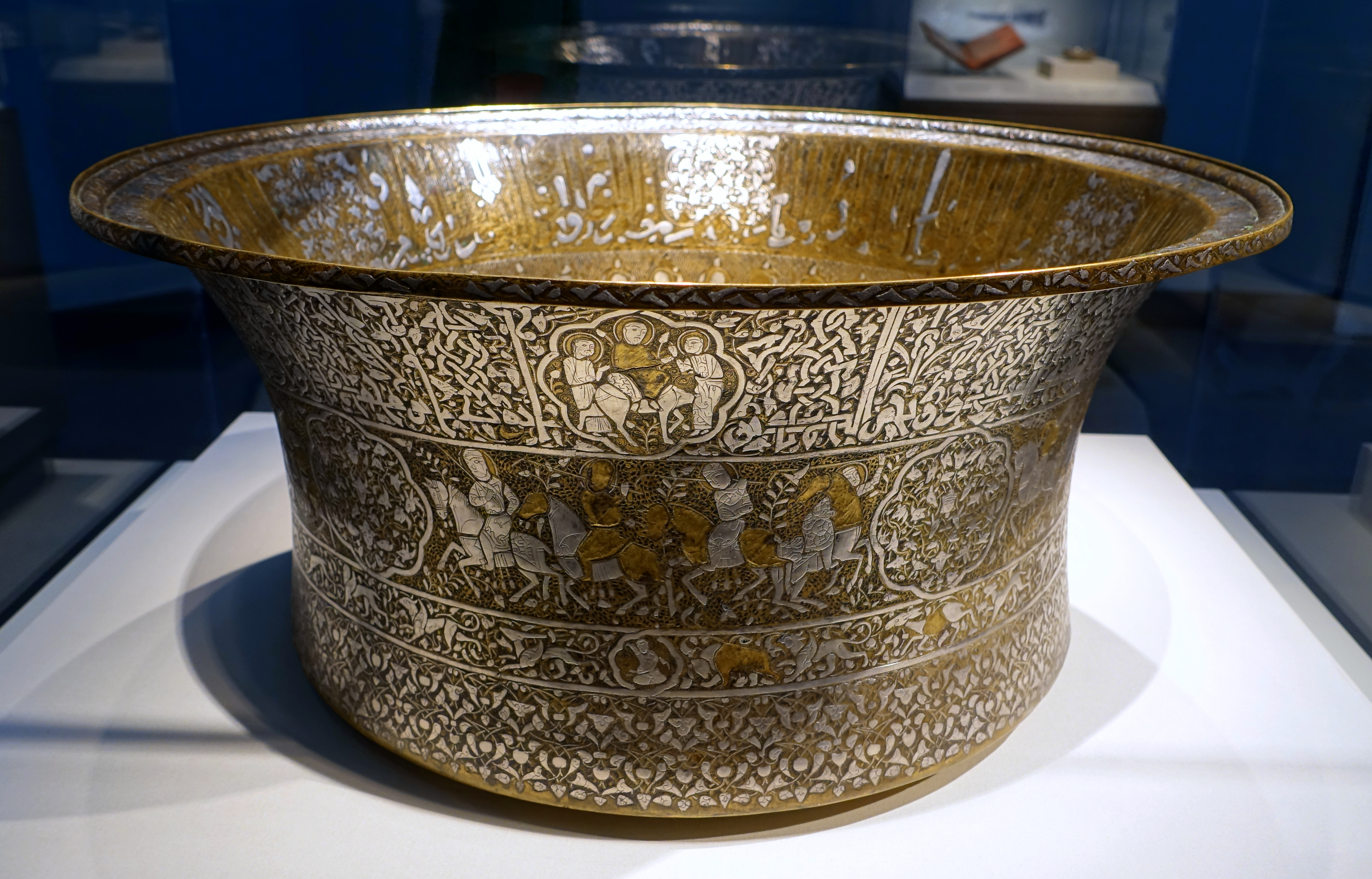
Basin made for Ayyubid Sultan As-Salih Ayyub, Damascus, Syria, 1247–1249. Brass inlaid with silver. Freer Gallery of Art.

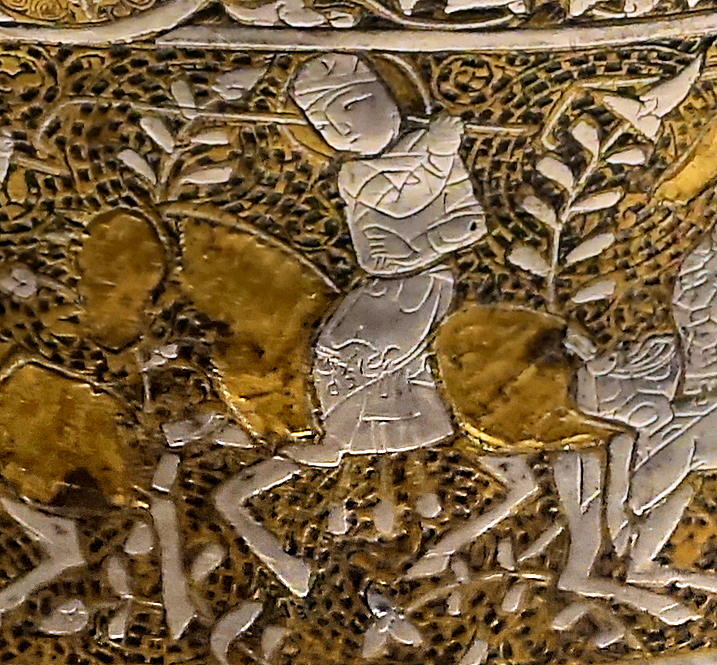
Horseman playing Polo (detail). Damascus, Syria, 1247–1249. Brass inlaid with silver. Freer Gallery of Art.

In 1248, a Crusader fleet of 1,800 boats and ships arrived in Cyprus with the intent of launching a Seventh Crusade against the Muslims by conquering Egypt. Their commander, Louis IX, attempted to enlist the Mongols to launch a coordinated attack on Egypt, but when this failed to materialize, the Crusader force sailed to Damietta and the local population there fled as soon as they landed. When as-Salih Ayyub, who was in Syria at the time, heard of this, he rushed back to Egypt, avoiding Damietta, instead reaching Mansurah. There, he organized an army and raised a commando force which harassed the Crusaders.

As-Salih Ayyub was ill and his health deteriorated further due to the mounting pressure from the Crusader offensive. His wife Shajar al-Durr called a meeting of all the war generals and thus became commander-in-chief of the Egyptian forces. She ordered the fortification of Mansurah and then stored large quantities of provisions and concentrated her forces there. She also organized a fleet of war galleys and scattered them at various strategic points along the Nile River. Crusader attempts to capture Mansurah were thwarted and King Louis found himself in a critical position. He managed to cross the Nile to launch a surprise attack against Mansurah. Meanwhile, as-Salih Ayyub died, but Shajar al-Durr and as-Salih Ayyub's Bahri Mamluk generals, including Rukn al-Din Baybars and Aybak, countered the assault and inflicted heavy losses on the Crusaders. Simultaneously, Egyptian forces cut off the Crusader's line of supply from Damietta, preventing the arrival of reinforcements. As-Salih Ayyub's son and the newly proclaimed Ayyubid sultan al-Mu'azzam Turan-Shah reached Mansurah at this point and intensified the battle against the Crusaders. The latter ultimately surrendered at the Battle of Fariskur, and King Louis and his companions were arrested.

Al-Mu'azzam Turan-Shah alienated the Mamluks soon after their victory at Mansurah and constantly threatened them and Shajar al-Durr. Fearing for their positions of power, the Bahri Mamluks revolted against the sultan and killed him in April 1250. Aybak married Shajar al-Durr and subsequently took over the government in Egypt in the name of al-Ashraf II who became sultan, but only nominally.

==== Dominance of Aleppo ====
Intent on restoring the supremacy of Saladin's direct descendants within the Ayyubid family, an-Nasir Yusuf was eventually able to enlist the backing of all of the Syria-based Ayyubid emirs in a common cause against Mamluk-dominated Egypt. By 1250, he took Damascus with relative ease and except for Hama and Transjordan, an-Nasir Yusuf's direct authority stood unbroken from the Khabur River in northern Mesopotamia to the Sinai Peninsula. In December 1250, he attacked Egypt after hearing of al-Mu'azzam Turan-Shah's death and the ascension of Shajar al-Durr. An-Nasir Yusuf's army was much larger and better-equipped than that of the Egyptian army, consisting of the forces of Aleppo, Homs, Hama, and those of Saladin's only surviving sons, Nusrat ad-Din and Turan-Shah ibn Salah ad-Din. Nonetheless, it suffered a major defeat at the hands of Aybak's forces. An-Nasir Yusuf subsequently returned to Syria, which was slowly slipping out of his control.

The Mamluks forged an alliance with the Crusaders in March 1252 and agreed to jointly launch a campaign against an-Nasir Yusuf. King Louis, who had been released after al-Mu'azzam Turan-Shah's murder, led his army to Jaffa, while Aybak intended to send his forces to Gaza. Upon hearing of the alliance, an-Nasir Yusuf immediately dispatched a force to Tell al-Ajjul, just outside Gaza, to prevent the junction of the Mamluk and Crusader armies. Meanwhile, the rest of the Ayyubid army was stationed in the Jordan Valley. Realizing that a war between them would greatly benefit the Crusaders, Aybak and an-Nasir Yusuf accepted Abbasid mediation via Najm ad-Din al-Badhirai. In April 1253, a treaty was signed whereby the Mamluks would retain control over all of Egypt and Palestine up to, but not including, Nablus, while an-Nasir Yusuf would be confirmed as the ruler of Muslim Syria. Thus, Ayyubid rule was officially ended in Egypt. After conflict arose between the Mamluks and the Ayyubids reignited, al-Badhirai arranged another treaty, this time giving an-Nasir Yusuf control of the Mamluks' territories in Palestine and al-Arish in Sinai. Instead of placing Ayyubids in charge, however, an-Nasir Yusuf handed Jerusalem to a Mamluk named Kutuk while Nablus and Jenin were given to Baibars.

For over a year after the settlement with the Mamluks, calm settled over an-Nasir Yusuf's reign, but on 11 December 1256 he sent two envoys to the Abbasids in Baghdad seeking formal investiture from the caliph, al-Musta'sim, for his role as "Sultan". This request was connected to an-Nasir's rivalry with Aybak, as the title would be useful in future disputes with the Mamluks. However, the Mamluks had sent their envoys to Baghdad previously to precisely ensure that an-Nasir Yusuf would not gain the title, putting al-Musta'sim in a difficult position.

In early 1257, Aybak was killed in a conspiracy, and was succeeded by his 15-year-old son, al-Mansur Ali, while Saif ad-Din Qutuz held an influential position. Soon after al-Mansur Ali's ascendancy rumors of another conspiracy to which an-Nasir Yusuf had an alleged connection emerged. The accused conspirator, al-Mansur Ali's vizier, Sharaf ad-Din al-Fa'izi, was strangled by Egyptian authorities. The Bahri Mamluks in Syria led by Baibars pressured an-Nasir Yusuf to intervene by invading Egypt, but he would not act, fearing the Bahri dynasty would usurp his throne if they gained Egypt.

==== Karak asserts independence ====
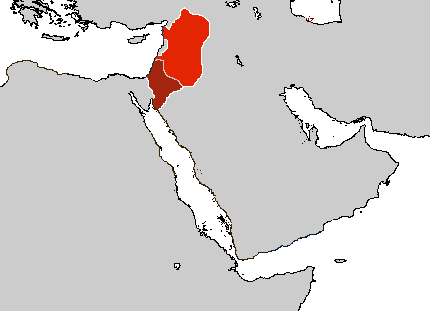
Ayyubid territories in 1257. Area in bright red controlled by an-Nasir Yusuf, while the area under dark red was under the nominal control of al-Mughith Umar of Kerak

Relations between an-Nasir Yusuf and the Bahri Mamluks grew tense after the former refused to invade Egypt. In October 1257, Baibars and his fellow Mamluks left Damascus or were expelled from the city and together they moved south to Jerusalem. When the governor Kutuk refused to aid them against an-Nasir Yusuf, Baibars deposed him and had al-Mugith Umar, the emir of Karak, pronounced in the khutba at the al-Aqsa Mosque; over the years, al-Mugith Umar had allowed the political dissidents of Cairo and Damascus, who sought protection from either the Mamluk and Ayyubid authorities, a safe haven within his territory.

Soon after gaining Jerusalem, Baibars conquered Gaza and an-Nasir Yusuf sent his army to Nablus in response. A battle ensued and the Mamluks ultimately fled across the Jordan River to the Balqa area. From there they reached Zughar at the southern tip of the Dead Sea where they sent their submission to Karak. Al-Mughith Umar's new relationship with Baibars solidified his independence from an-Nasir Yusuf's Syria. To ensure his independence, al-Mughith Umar began to distribute the territories of Palestine and Transjordan among the Bahri Mamluks. The new allies assembled a small army and headed for Egypt. In spite of initial gains in Palestine and al-Arish, they withdrew after seeing how overwhelmingly outnumbered they were by the Egyptian army. Al-Mughith Umar and Baibars were not discouraged, however, and launched an army 1,500 regular cavalry to Sinai at the beginning of 1258, but again were defeated by the Mamluks of Egypt.

==== Mongol invasion and collapse of the empire ====
The Mongol conquest of Ayyubid Syria

The Ayyubids had been under the nominal sovereignty of the Mongol Empire after a Mongol force targeted Ayyubid territories in Anatolia in 1244. An-Nasir Yusuf sent an embassy to the Mongol capital Karakorum in 1250, shortly after assuming power. These understandings did not last, however, and the Mongol Great Khan, Möngke, issued a directive to his brother Hulagu to extend the realms of the empire to the Nile River. The latter raised an army of 120,000 and in 1258, sacked Baghdad and slaughtered its inhabitants, including Caliph al-Musta'sim and most of his family after the Ayyubids failed to assemble an army to protect the city. That same year the Ayyubids lost Diyar Bakr to the Mongols.

An-Nasir Yusuf sent a delegation to Hulagu afterward, repeating his protestations to submission. Hulagu refused to accept the terms and so an-Nasir Yusuf called on Cairo for aid. This plea coincided with a successful coup by the Cairo-based Mamluks against the remaining symbolic Ayyubid leadership in Egypt, with strongman Qutuz officially taking power. Meanwhile, an Ayyubid army was assembled at Birzeh, just north of Damascus to defend the city against the Mongols who were now marching towards northern Syria. Aleppo was soon besieged within a week and in January 1260 it fell to the Mongols. The Great Mosque and the Citadel of Aleppo were razed and most of the inhabitants were killed or sold into slavery. The destruction of Aleppo caused panic in Muslim Syria; The Ayyubid emir of Homs, al-Ashraf Musa, offered to ally with Mongols at the approach of their army and was allowed to continue governance of the city by Hulagu. Hama also capitulated without resisting, but did not join forces with the Mongols. An-Nasir Yusuf opted to flee Damascus to seek protection in Gaza.

Hulagu departed for Karakorum and left Kitbuqa, a Nestorian Christian general, to continue the Mongol conquest. Damascus capitulated after the arrival of the Mongol army, but was not sacked like other captured Muslim cities. However, from Gaza, an-Nasir Yusuf managed to rally the small garrison he left in the Citadel of Damascus to rebel against the Mongol occupation. The Mongols retaliated by launching a massive artillery assault on the citadel and when it became apparent that an-Nasir Yusuf was unable to relieve the city with a newly assembled army, the garrison surrendered.

The Mongols proceeded by conquering Samaria, killing most of the Ayyubid garrison in Nablus, and then advanced south, as far as Gaza, unhindered. An-Nasir Yusuf was soon captured by the Mongols and used to persuade the garrison at Ajlun to capitulate. Afterward, the junior Ayyubid governor of Banyas allied with the Mongols, who had now gained control of most of Syria and al-Jazira, effectively ending Ayyubid power in the region. On 3 September 1260, the Egypt-based Mamluk army led by Qutuz and Baibars challenged Mongol authority and decisively defeated their forces in the Battle of Ain Jalut, outside Zir'in in the Jezreel Valley. Five days later, the Mamluks took Damascus and within a month, most of Syria was in Bahri Mamluk hands. Meanwhile, an-Nasir Yusuf was killed in captivity.

=== Remnants of the dynasty ===
Many of the Ayyubid emirs of Syria were discredited by Qutuz for collaborating with the Mongols, but since al-Ashraf Musa defected and fought alongside the Mamluks at Ain Jalut, he was allowed to continue his rule over Homs. Al-Mansur of Hama had fought alongside the Mamluks from the start of their conquest and because of this, Hama continued to be ruled by the Ayyubid descendants of al-Muzaffar Umar. After al-Ashraf Musa's death in 1262, the new Mamluk sultan, Baibars, annexed Homs. The next year, al-Mughith Umar was tricked into surrendering Karak to Baibars and was executed soon after for having previously sided with the Mongols.

The last Ayyubid ruler of Hama died in 1299 and Hama briefly passed through direct Mamluk suzerainty. However, in 1310, under the patronage of the Mamluk sultan al-Nasir Muhammad, Hama was restored to the Ayyubids under the well-known geographer and author Abu al-Fida. The latter died in 1331 and was succeeded by his son al-Afdal Muhammad, who eventually lost the favor of his Mamluk overlords. He was removed from his post in 1341 and Hama was formally placed under Mamluk rule.

In southeastern Anatolia, the Ayyubids continued to rule the principality of Hisn Kayfa and managed to remain an autonomous entity, independent of the Mongol Ilkhanate, which ruled northern Mesopotamia until the 1330s. After the breakup of the Ilkhanate, their former vassals in the area, the Artuqids, waged war against the Ayyubids of Hisn Kayfa in 1334, but were decisively defeated, with the Ayyubids gaining the Artuqids' possessions on the left bank of the Tigris River. In the 14th century, the Ayyubids rebuilt the castle of Hisn Kayfa which served as their stronghold. The Ayyubids of Hisn Kayfa were vassals of the Mamluks and later the Dulkadirids until being supplanted by the Ottoman Empire in the early 16th century.

== Military ==
Fundamentally, Saladin's army, which grew out of Nur ad-Din's army, was mainly based on Kurdo-Turkic troops, alongside some Fatimid and Arab tribal contingents. Kurds made up one-third of Saladin's army and were mostly organized in tribal units and corps, such as al-Hakkariyya, al-Mehraniyya (branch of Hadhbāni), al-Humaydiyya and al-Zarzariyya. In 1181, Saladin's Egyptian army was composed of 111 amirs, 6,976 tawashi (cavalrymen) and 1,153 qara-ghulams (second grade cavalrymen). In addition to the dominant contribution of Egypt, each urban centre in the Levant and the Jazira maintained contingents depending on its resources, which were called by Saladin when needed. The estimated total of 16,000 regular cavalry were directly subject to Saladin's command, in addition to 4000 troops which the Zengids of Mosul and the other Zengid principalities supplied. It was with the large bulk of this army, some 12,000 cavalrymen, that Saladin defeated the Crusader forces at Hattin and achieved his later victories.

Not much is known about how the Ayyubids graded their officer corps. A number of military titles appear in inscriptions on some Ayyubid buildings, including amir, amir al-kabir, supasalar and amir supasalar. These might refer to different ranks.

The Ayyubid army largely consisted of free-born soldiers, but the sultan, princes and amirs also acquired their own personal Mamluk contingents. These included, for instance, the Asadiyya (named after Asad ad-Din Shirkuh), the Salahiyya (after Saladin), the 'Adiliyya (after Adil I), the Kamiliyya (after al-Kamil), and others. The lack of unity and the rivalries between these contingents eventually weakened the Ayyubid army. Furthermore, a few traces of ethnic hostility may have existed between Kurds, who were free-born, and Turks who generally made up the Mamluk contingents. Although the army was paid by a monthly salary called jāmakiyya, the amirs were often assigned an iqta' (fiefdom) by the sultan or other rulers. From the income of these iqta, they were required to provide a specific number of fully equipped and trained cavalrymen when the sultan called them to arms.

== Government ==
=== Structure ===
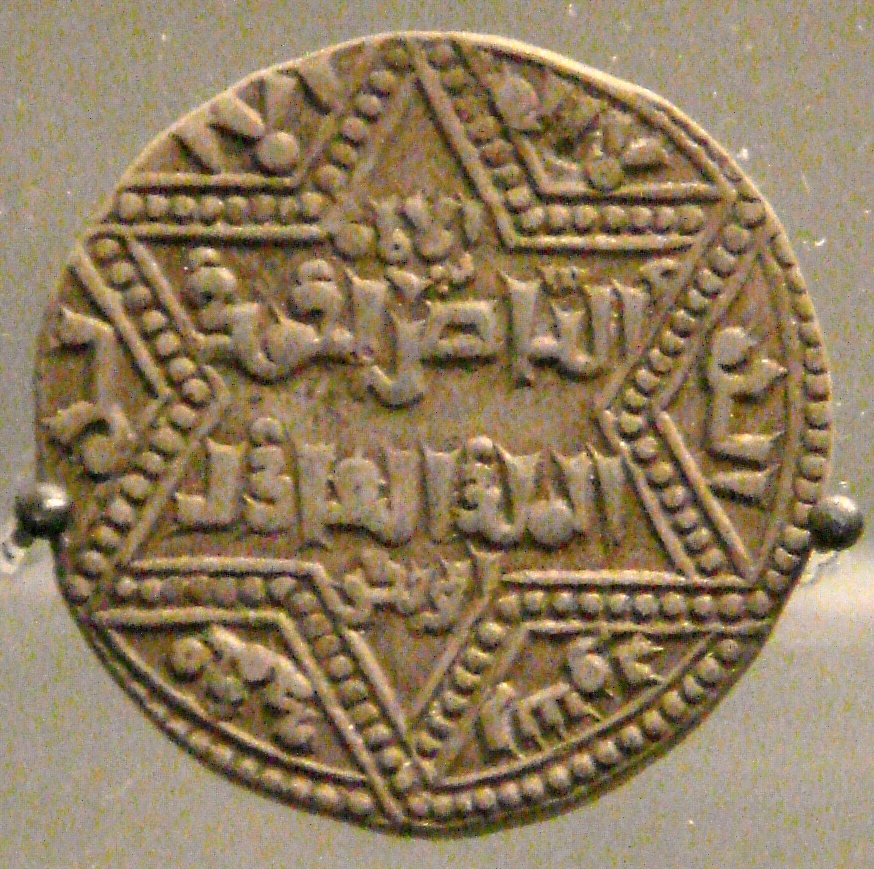
An Ayyubid coin minted in Aleppo bearing the name of Emir al-Zahir

Saladin structured the Ayyubid empire around the concept of collective sovereignty i.e. a confederation of principalities held together by the idea of family rule. Under this arrangement there existed numerous "petty sultans" while one family member, as-Sultan al-Mu'azzam, reigned supreme. After the death of Saladin, this coveted position became open to whoever was strong enough to seize it. Subsequent rivalry between the Ayyubids of Syria and Egypt reached a point where the rulers of each territory would at times collude with Crusaders against the other. Ayyubid rule differed in these two regions. In Syria, each major city was ruled as a relatively independent principality under an Ayyubid family member, while in Egypt the long tradition of centralized rule enabled the Ayyubids to maintain direct control over the province from Cairo. It was Baghdad, seat of the Caliphate, however, that exercised cultural and political hegemony over the Ayyubid territories, particularly those in Southwest Asia. For instance, the qadi ("chief justice") of Damascus was still appointed by the Abbasids during Ayyubid rule.

Political power was concentrated in the Ayyubid household which was not necessarily characterized only by blood relation; slaves and intimates could acquire great, and even supreme power within it. It was a common occurrence for the mothers of young Ayyubid rulers to act as independent powers or in a few cases, rulers in their own right. Eunuchs exercised substantial power under the Ayyubids, serving as attendants and atabegs within the household or as emirs, governors, and army commanders outside the household. One of Saladin's most important supporters was the eunuch Baha ad-Din ibn Shaddad who helped him depose the Fatimids, dispossess their properties, and construct the wall of Cairo's citadel. Following the death of al-Aziz Uthman, he became the regent of his son al-Mansur and effectively ruled over Egypt for a short time before the arrival of al-Adil. Later sultans appointed eunuchs as deputy sultans and even awarded them sovereignty over certain cities, such as Shams al-Din Sawab who was given the Jaziran cities of Amid and Diyar Bakr in 1239.

The Ayyubids had three principal means of recruiting the educated elites whom they needed to administer their cities and towns. Some of these local leaders, known as shaykhs, entered the service of an Ayyubid ruling household and thus their bids for power were supported from Ayyubid household revenues and influence. Others were paid directly out of revenues made from the diwan, a high governmental body of the state. The third method was assignment to the shaykhs of the revenues of charitable endowments, known as waqfs. The Ayyubids, like their various predecessors in the region, had relatively few state agencies by which they could penetrate their cities and towns. To link themselves with the educated elite of their cities, they relied on the political usage of patronage practices. The assignment of waqf revenue to this elite was similar to the assignment of fiefs (iqta'at) to the commanders and generals of the army. In both cases, it enabled the Ayyubids to recruit a dependent, but not administratively subordinate elite.

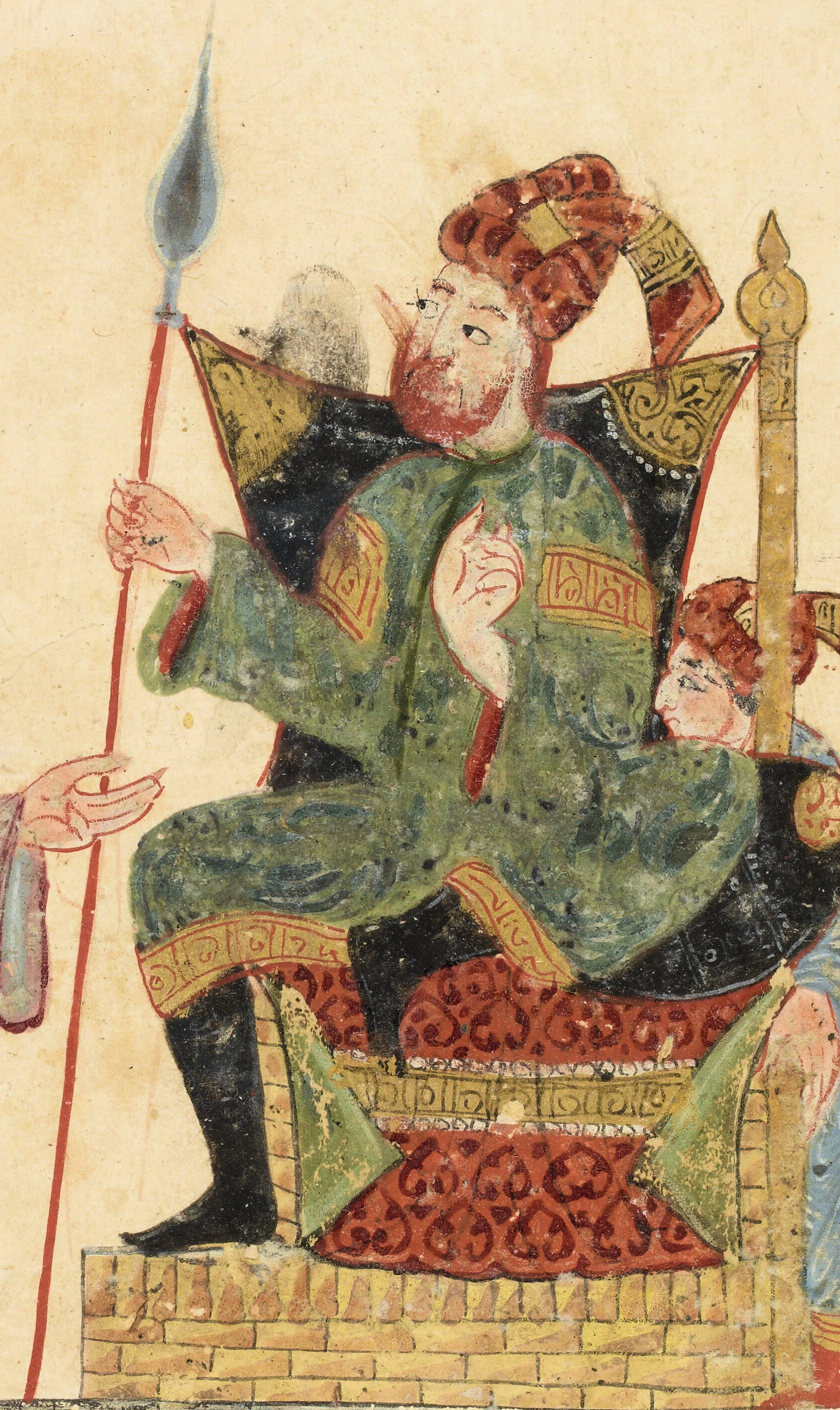
The Governor of al-Rahba. Ayyubid period. Maqamat of al-Hariri, Baghdad (1237). The red beard denotes foreigness.

Following their conquest of Jerusalem in 1187, the Ayyubids under Saladin may have been the first to establish the position of amir al-hajj (commander of the pilgrimage) to protect the annual Hajj caravans leaving Damascus for Mecca with the appointment of Tughtakin ibn Ayyub to the office.

=== Seat of government ===
The seat of Ayyubid government from Saladin's rule from the 1170s up to al-Adil's reign in 1218 had been Damascus. The city provided a strategic advantage in the constant war with the Crusaders and allowed the sultan to keep an eye on his relatively ambitious vassals in Syria and al-Jazira. Cairo was too remote to serve as a base of operations, but had always served as the economic foundation of the empire. This rendered the city a critical constituent in the repertoire of the Ayyubid possessions. When Saladin was proclaimed sultan in Cairo in 1171, he chose the Fatimid-built Lesser Western Palace (part of a larger palace complex in Cairo isolated from the urban sprawl) as the seat of government. Saladin himself resided in the former Fatimid vizier palace, Turan-Shah took up a former Fatimid prince's living quarter, and their father occupied the Pearl Pavilion which was situated outside Cairo overlooking the city's canal. The successive Ayyubid sultans of Egypt would live in the Lesser Western Palace.

After al-Adil I seized the throne in Cairo and with it the sultanate of the Ayyubid oligarchy, the period of rivalry between Damascus and Cairo to become capital of the Ayyubid empire commenced. Under al-Adil and al-Kamil, Damascus continued as an autonomous province whose ruler reserved the right to designate his own heir, but during as-Salih Ayyub's rule, military campaigns against Syria reduced Damascus to a vassal of Cairo. In addition, Ayyub established new rules both in administration and government to centralize his regime; he conferred the most prominent positions of the state to his close confidants, instead of his Ayyubid relatives. His wife Shajar al-Durr, for example, managed the affairs of Egypt while he was in Syria. Ayyub officially delegated his authority to his dead son Khalil and made al-Durr act formally on Khalil's behalf.

=== Iqta' system ===
Saladin established the iqta' system that remained in practice until the end of Ayyubid rule. The iqta system of the Ayyubids was modeled after the Seljuk system, but was more centralized. An Ayyubid fief holder had two different kinds of fiefs: a special one (khassa), for his own personal needs, and another one called iqta', for the maintenance of his troops. Ayyubid feudalism in Egypt differed from the feudal system in the other parts of the sultanate (Syria and Al-Jazirah), as the Ayyubid feudal lords in Syria had more power and independence than their Egyptian counterparts. The iqta' was held mainly by Ayyubid dynasty members, Kurds or Mamluks. The Kurdish fief holders consisted of four tribes, the al-Hakkariyya, al-Humaydiyya, al-Mihraniyya and al-Zarzariyya. However, during the reign of al-Salih Ayyub, the al-Qaymariyya became the dominant Kurdish tribe within the Ayyubid military oligarchy.

== Demographics ==
=== Religion, ethnicity and language ===
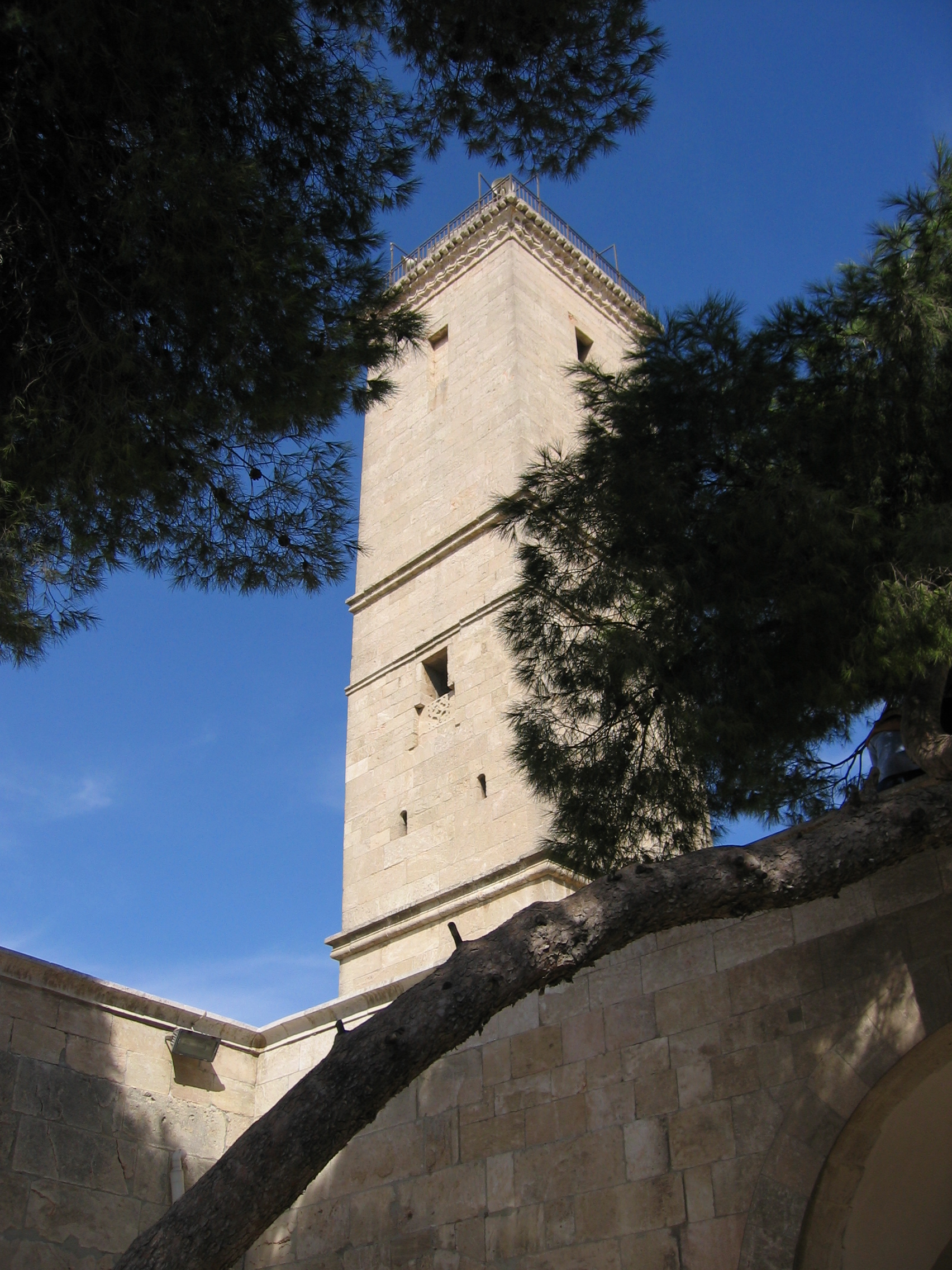
Minaret of the Great Mosque of the Aleppo Citadel, built by az-Zahir Ghazi in 1214

By the 12th century, Islam was the dominant religion in the Middle East. It is not certain, however, if it was the religion of the majority outside the Arabian Peninsula. Arabic was the language of high culture and of the urban population, although other languages dating to pre-Islamic rule were still being used to a certain extent. Most Egyptians were speaking Arabic by the time the Ayyubids took power there.

Kurdish was the mother tongue of the Ayyubids, at the time of their departure from Dvin. Sultan Saladin spoke both Arabic and Kurdish, and likely Turkish as well. There was a strong ethnic consciousness between the Ayyubids and other Kurds. According to the historian R. Stephen Humphreys, Saladin obtained the Fatimid vizierate partly on the strength of it. Kurdish ethnic consciousness was reinforced by the existence of ethnic friction. After Shirkuh's death, Saladin's close associate Diya' al-Din Isa al-Hakkari, a Kurd, visited the leaders of each faction contending for power to try to win them over to the election of Saladin, and to one Kurdish emir, Qutb al-Din Khusrau ibn al-Talal, he used the following argument: "Verily, everybody is for Saladin except you and al-Yaruqi [a Turkmen amir from the north Syrian Yürük tribe]. What is needed now, above all, is an understanding between you and Saladin, especially because of his Kurdish origin, so that the command does not go from him to the Turks." Within a few months of Saladin's election, all the Turkish amirs had returned to Syria to save the Turks, although no conflict happened.

The Ayyubid period represents the climax of Kurdish integration in Egypt and Syria, to the extent that the Ayyubid dynasty appeared as Kurdish dynasty par excellence. The Ayyubids acted as a Kurdish dynasty, functioning as a tribal catalyst. Kurds from various tribes and social status occupied high positions within the Ayyubid realm, from military to religious elites. The Ayyubids reinforced the nexus between the Sultanate and their Kurdish kinsmen, while the Kurds maintained their tribal ethos, solidarities and link to their original homeland. While the Ayyubid military was very ethnically diverse, elite units were dominated by Kurds, and Saladin's personal guard was generally reserved for Kurds. Ibn Fadlallah al-Umari wrote that many Lurs had migrated from Luristan to the Levant and Egypt and had a significant presence there, although Saladin saw them as a potential challenge to his elite Kurdish troops and eventually ordered the massacre of all Lurs, after which the Luri population in the Levant and Egypt had vanished.

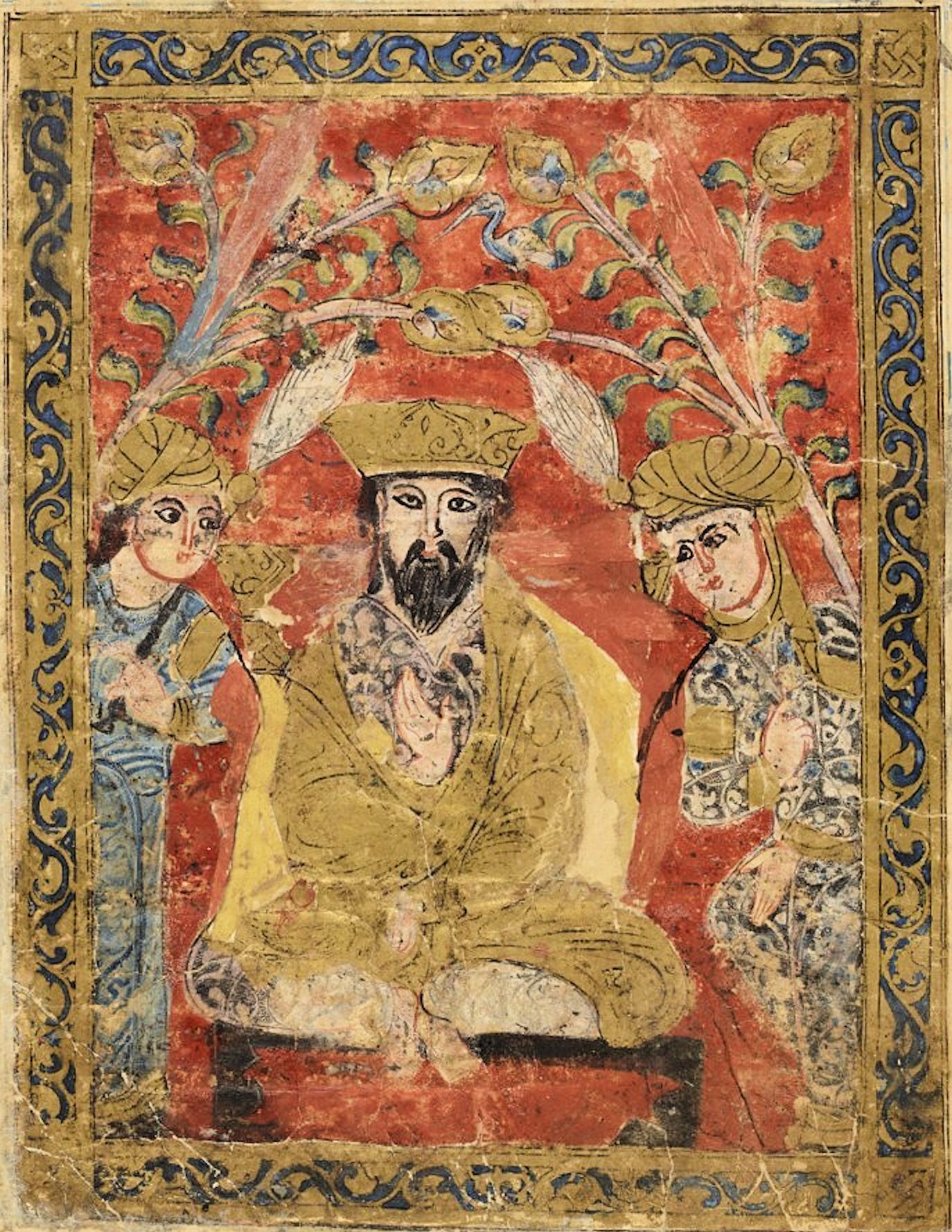
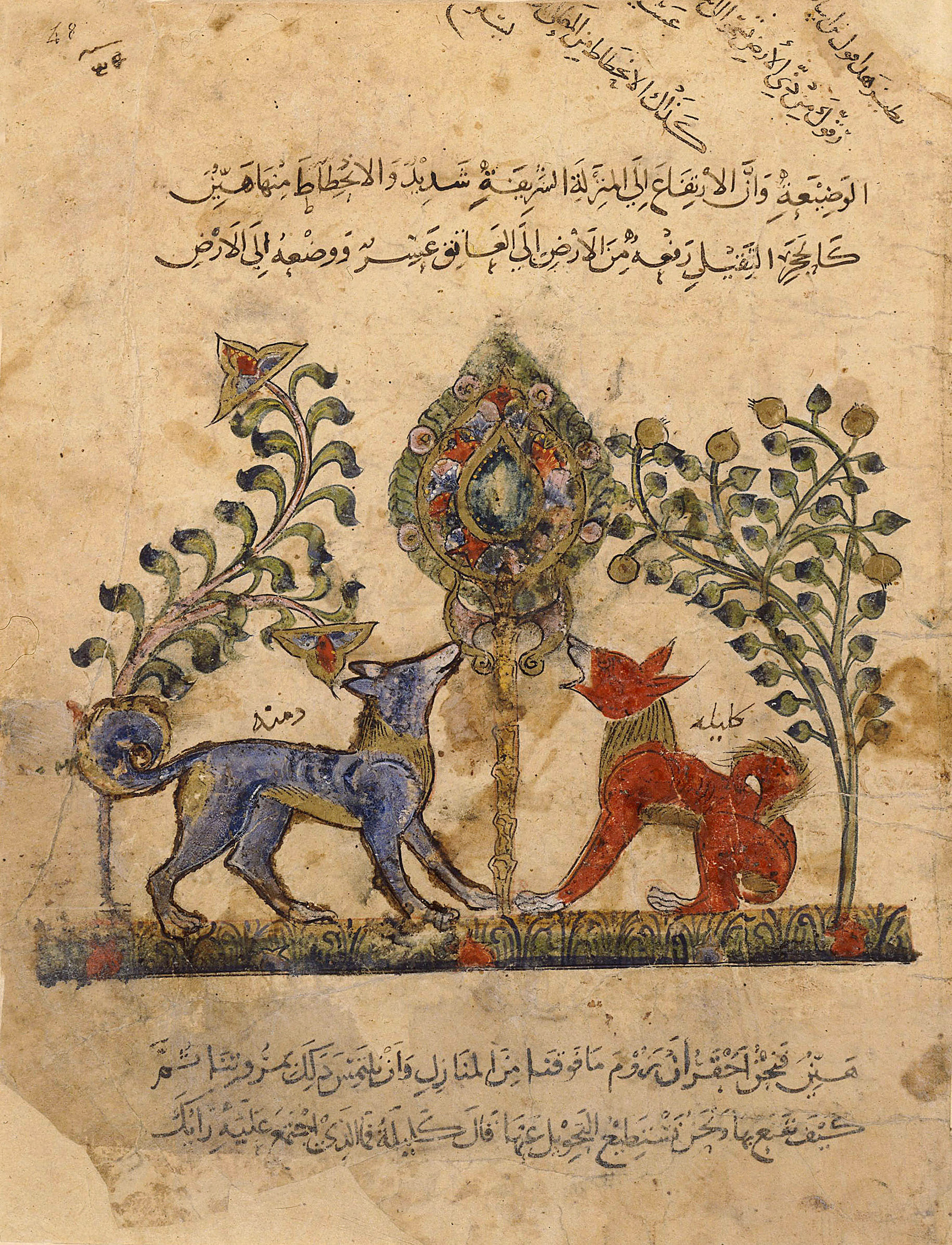
The first known illustrated manuscript of Kalīla wa-Dimna (BNF, Arabe 3465), written in Arabic c.1220 in Egypt or Syria, is generally considered as an Ayyubid work.

Arabic surnames were much more prevalent among the Ayyubids, a tribe that had already been partially assimilated into the Arabic-speaking world before its members came to power, than non-Arabic names. However, the Ayyubids continued their connection with their original homeland, that is Iranic culture. As it is evident that Al-Adil along with his son and successor, Al-Mu'azzam Isa spoke Kurdish and maybe even Persian. As Al-Mu'azzam Isa ordered the translation of Shahnameh into Arabic, the translation was completed in 1224 by the well-known writer Fath ibn Ali al-Bundari. Some Iranic romanticism can be detected in names such as Shahan-Shah, Bahram-Shah, farrukh-Shah and Turan-Shah. Under the Ayyubids, many scholars note that Kurdish gained a privileged status but admit that there is a paucity of evidence due to the lack of written documents in Kurdish from the Ayyubid period. The Ayyubid Military class often spoke Kurdish and Turkish rather than Arabic. Most of the Ayyubid rulers spoke fluent Arabic and a number of them, such as az-Zahir Ghazi, al-Mu'azzam Isa and the minor emirs of Hama, composed Arabic poetry. Al-Salih Ayyub, however, did not write poetry, but was a patron of two great Arab poets, Baha al-Din Zuhayr and Ibn Matrouh.

Kurds and free-born Kurdish mercenaries dominated the cavalry and nomadic Turcomans and Arabs filled the ranks of the infantry. These groups typically settled in the pastoral areas outside the cities, the centers of cultural life, and as such they were relatively isolated from the Arabic-dominant urban environment. This isolation allowed them to preserve their traditions. Like their Fatimid predecessors, the Ayyubid rulers of Egypt maintained a substantial force of mamluks (military slaves). By the first half of the 13th century mamluks were mostly drawn from Kipchak Turks and Circassians and there is strong evidence that these forces continued to speak Kipchak Turkish.

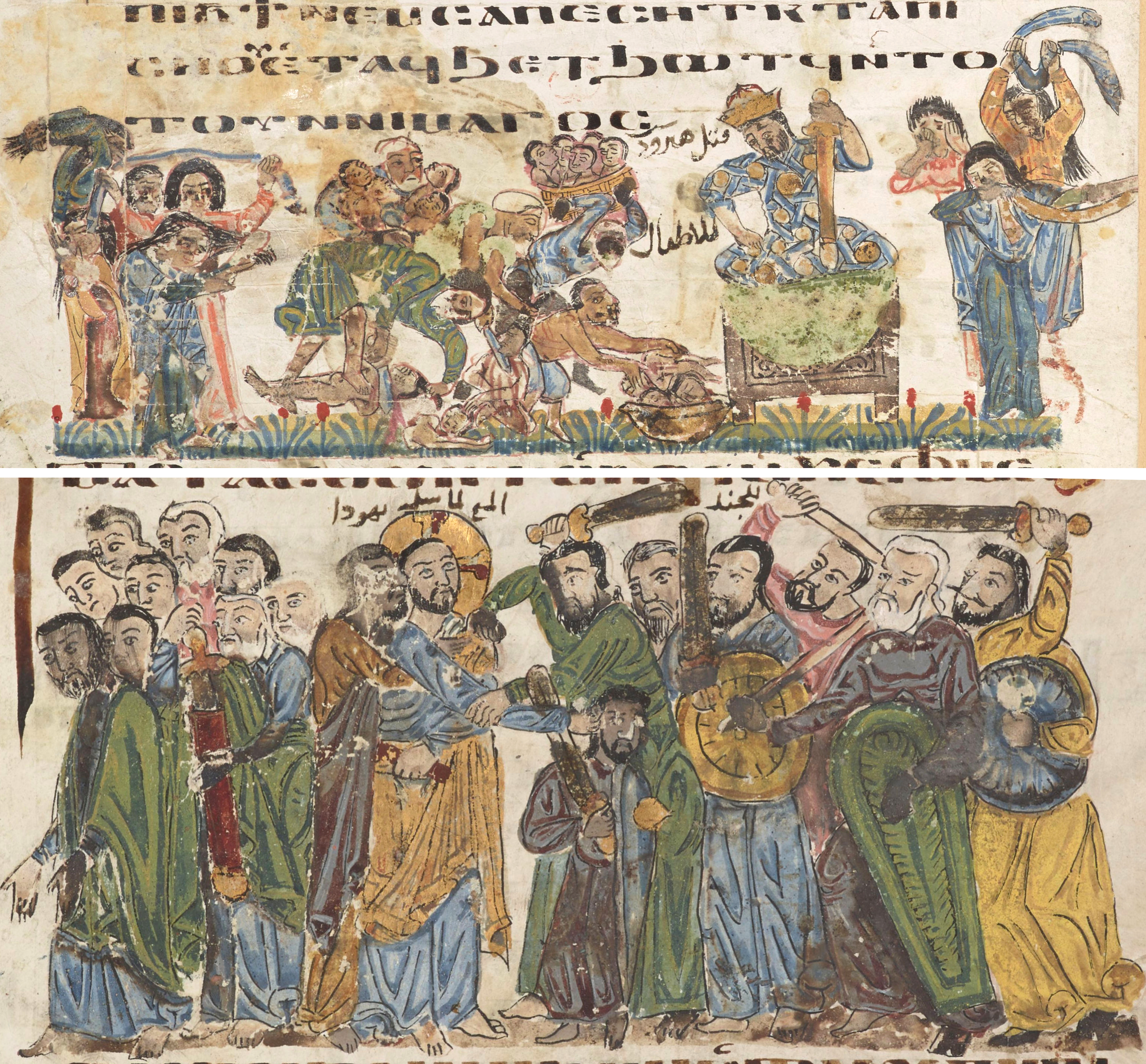
Miniatures from a Coptic Gospel (BNF Copte 13), Damietta, Egypt, Ayyubid period, 1179–80.

In Egypt, there were large communities of Coptic Christians, Melkites, Turks, Armenians, and Black Africans. Coptic Christians, who had formed the majority of Egypt's population during the early Islamic period, remained a substantial minority. The native Coptic language had by this point largely ceased to be spoken but continued as a literary and liturgical language. The translation of Coptic literature into Arabic, which had begun in preceding centuries, also accelerated during the 13th century, engendering a "Coptic Renaissance" that enabled Coptic identity to be preserved within a wider Arabic cultural environment.

Under the Fatimids, non-Muslims in Egypt generally prospered, with the exception of Caliph al-Hakim's reign. However, with Shirkuh's ascendancy to the vizier position, a number edicts were enacted against the non-Muslim population. With the advent of the Syrian expeditionary force (consisting of Oghuz Turks and Kurds) into Egypt, waves of maltreatment of minorities occurred, irrespective of religion. These incidents occurred while Shirkuh and Saladin were viziers to the Fatimid caliph.

At the beginning of Saladin's reign as sultan in Egypt, upon the encouragement of his adviser, Qadi al-Fadil, Christians were prohibited from employment in the fiscal administration, but various Ayyubid emirs continued to allow Christians to serve in their posts. A number of other regulations were imposed, including the bans on alcohol consumption, religious processions, and the ringing of church bells. Conversion of formerly high-ranking Christians and their families to Islam took place throughout the early period of Ayyubid rule. According to historian Yaakov Lev, the persecution of non-Muslims had some permanent effects on them, but nonetheless, the effects were local and contained. To manage Mediterranean trade, the Ayyubids permitted Europeans—mainly Italians, but also French and Catalans—to settle in Alexandria in large numbers. However, in the aftermath of the Fifth Crusade, 3,000 merchants from the area were arrested or expelled.

The majority of Syria's population in the 12th century consisted of Sunni Muslims, typically from Arab or Kurdish backgrounds. There were also sizable Muslim communities of Twelver Shias, Druzes, and Alawites. The Ismaili presence was small and most were of Persian origin, having migrated from Alamut. They mostly resided in the mountainous area near the northern Syrian coastline. Large Christian communities existed in northern Syria, Palestine, Transjordan and Upper Mesopotamia. They were Aramaic-speaking and indigenous to the area, mostly belonging to the Syriac Orthodox Church. They lived in villages of Christian or mixed Christian and Muslim population, monasteries, and in small towns where they appear to have been on friendly terms with their Muslim neighbors. Ideologically, they were led by the Patriarch of Antioch.

In Yemen and Hadramaut, much of the population adhered to Shia Islam in its Zaydi form. The inhabitants of Upper Mesopotamia were made up of Sunni Muslim Kurds and Turks, although there was a significant Yazidi minority in that region as well. Jews were spread throughout the Islamic world and most Ayyubid cities had Jewish communities due to the important roles Jews played in trade, manufacture, finance, and medicine. In Yemen and some parts of Syria, Jews also lived in rural towns. The Ayyubid emir of Yemen in 1197–1202, al-Malik Mu'izz Isma'il, attempted to forcibly convert the Jews of Aden, but this process ceased after his death in 1202. Within the Jewish community, particularly in Egypt and Palestine, there existed a minority of Karaites.

The Ayyubids generally employed Kurds, Turks, and people from the Caucasus for the higher-ranking posts of the military and bureaucratic fields. Not much is known about the foot soldiers of the Ayyubid army, but the numbers of cavalrymen are known to have fluctuated between 8,500 and 12,000. The cavalry was largely composed of free-born Kurds and Turks whom Ayyubid emirs and sultans purchased as military slaves or mamluks; in the early days of the Ayyubids, there was also a large contingent of Turkomans. In addition, there existed Arab auxiliaries, former Fatimid units such as the Nubians, and separate Arab contingents—notably from the Kinaniyya tribe, who were largely devoted to the defense of Egypt. Rivalry between Kurdish and Turkish troops occurred occasionally when leading positions were at stake and towards the end of Ayyubid rule, Turks outnumbered Kurds in the army. Despite their Kurdish background, the sultans remained impartial to both groups.

=== Population ===
There is no accurate figure for the population of the various territories under Ayyubid rule. Colin McEvedy and Richard Jones suggest that in the 12th century, Syria had a population of 2.7 million, Palestine and Transjordan had 500,000 inhabitants, and Egypt had a population of under 5 million. Josiah C. Russel states that in this same period there were 2.4 million people in Syria living in 8,300 villages, leaving a population of 230,000–300,000 living in ten cities, eight of which were Muslim cities under Ayyubid control. The largest were Edessa (pop. 24,000), Damascus (pop. 15,000), Aleppo (pop. 14,000), and Jerusalem (pop. 10,000). Smaller cities included Homs, Hama, Gaza, and Hebron.

Russel estimated the Egyptian village population to be 3.3 million in 2,300 villages, a high density for rural populations in the time period. He attributes it to the high productivity of Egyptian soil which allowed for increased agricultural growth. The urban population was much lower, 233,100, consisting of 5.7% of the total Egyptian population. The largest cities were Cairo (pop. 60,000), Alexandria (pop. 30,000), Qus (pop. 25,000), Damietta (pop. 18,000), Fayyum (pop. 13,000), and Bilbeis (pop. 10,000). Numerous smaller cities dotted the Nile River. Among the latter were Damanhur, Asyut, and Tanta. Cities in Egypt were also densely populated, mainly because of greater urbanization and industrialization than elsewhere.

== Economy ==
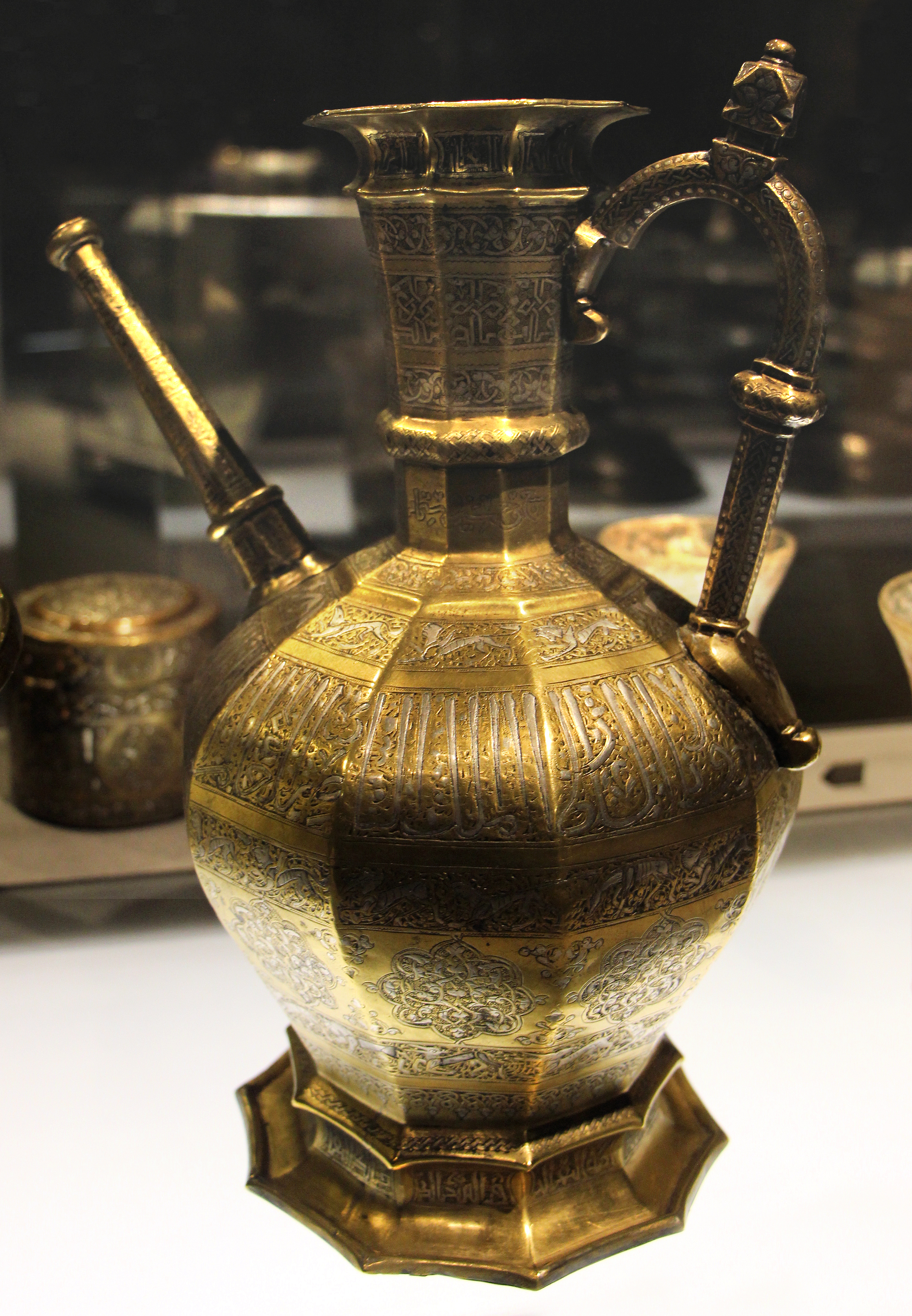
Ayyubid inlaid metal ewer, in the name of Ayyubid Sultan al-Malik al-Nasir Salah al-din Yusuf. 1258–1259, Damascus, Syria. Louvre Museum.

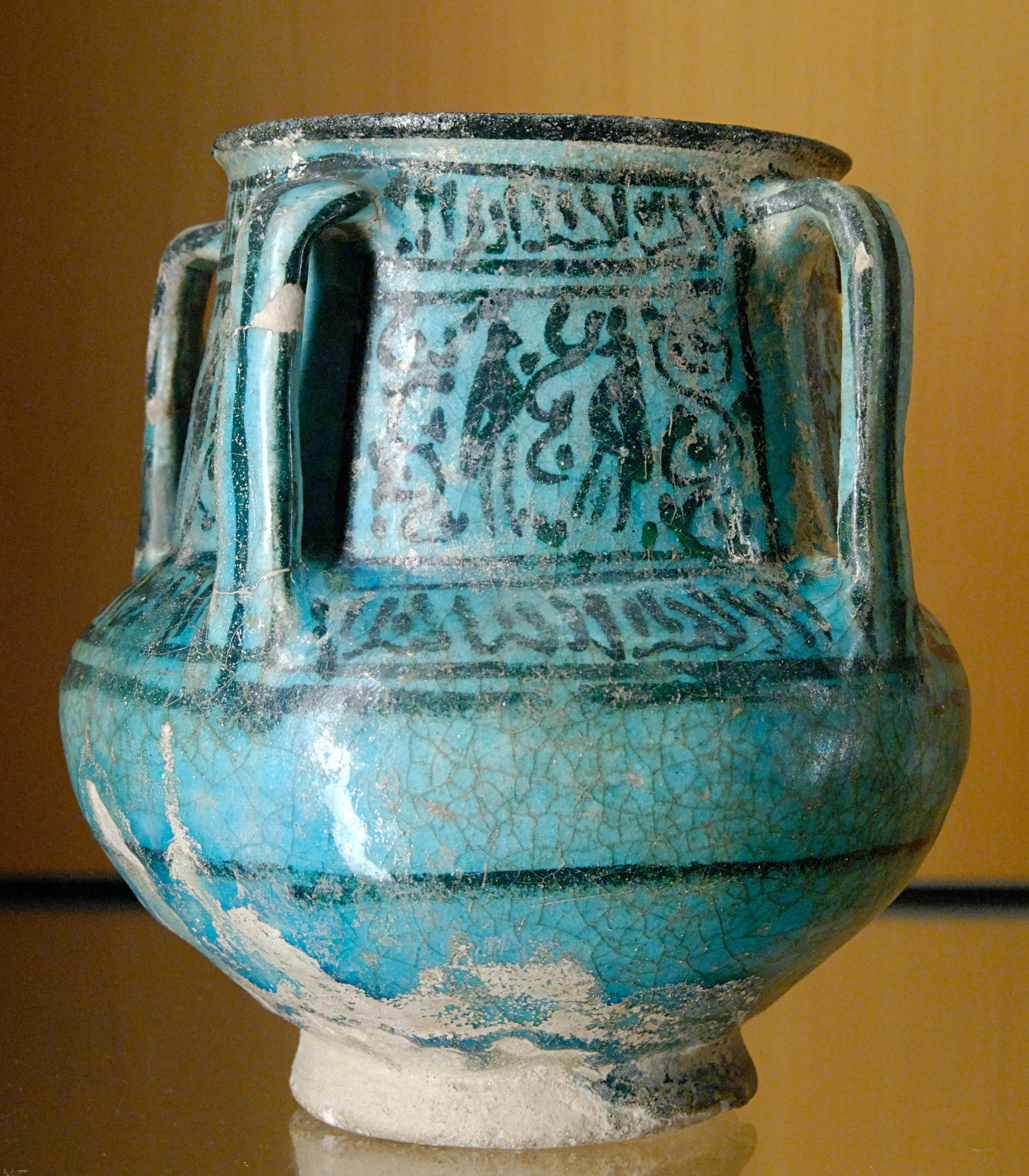
An example of Ayyubid pottery from Egypt

Having pushed the Crusaders out of most of Syria, the Ayyubids generally adopted a policy of peace with them. The war with the Crusaders did not prevent Muslims under Ayyubid governance from developing good commercial relations with European states. This led to fruitful interaction between both sides in different fields of economic activity, particularly in agriculture and trade.

Numerous measures were undertaken by the Ayyubids to increase agricultural production. Canals were dug to facilitate the irrigation of agricultural lands throughout the empire. Cultivation of sugarcane was officially encouraged to meet the great demand of it by both the local inhabitants and the Europeans. Meanwhile, as a result of the Crusades, several new plants were introduced to Europe, including sesame, carob, millet, rice, lemons, melons, apricots, and shallots.

The main factor which boosted industry and trade under the Ayyubids was the new interests Europeans developed when they came into contact with the Muslims. Commodities included incense, scents, fragrant oils, and aromatic plants from Arabia and India, as well as ginger, alum, and aloes. Likewise, Europeans developed new tastes in the matter of fashions, clothing, and home furnishing. Rugs, carpets, and tapestries manufactured in the Middle East and Central Asia were introduced to the West through Crusader-Ayyubid interaction. Christian pilgrims visiting Jerusalem returned with Arab reliquaries for the keeping of relics. In addition, eastern works of art in glass, pottery, gold, silver, etc., were highly prized in Europe.

The European demand for agricultural products and industrial commodities stimulated maritime activity and international trade to an unprecedented extent. The Ayyubids played a leading role in this as they controlled sea-trade routes which passed through the ports of Yemen and Egypt via the Red Sea. The trade policy of the Ayyubids placed them in a position of great advantage; although they cooperated with the Genoans and Venetians in the Mediterranean Sea, they prevented them from having access to the Red Sea. Thus, they kept the trade of the Indian Ocean exclusively in their hands. In the Mediterranean trade, the Ayyubids also profited through taxes and commissions levied upon Italian merchants.

Upon the development of international trade, the elementary principles of credit and banking were developed. Both Jewish and Italian merchants had regular banking agents in Syria, who transacted business on behalf of their masters. Bills of exchange were also used by them in their dealings with one another and money was deposited in various banking centers throughout Syria. The encouragement of trade and industry provided the Ayyubid sultans with the funds needed for military expenditure as well as for developmental and everyday lifestyle works. Special attention was made to the economic state of the empire under al-Adil and al-Kamil. The latter maintained a strict control over expenditure; it is said that on his death he left a treasury which was equivalent to the budget of one full year.

=== Education ===
Being well-educated themselves, the Ayyubid rulers became munificent patrons of learning and educational activity. Different madrasa-type schools were built by them throughout the empire, not only for education, but also to popularize knowledge of Sunni Islam. According to Ibn Jubayr, under Saladin, Damascus had 30 schools, 100 baths, and a large number of Sufi dervish monasteries. He also built several schools in Aleppo, Jerusalem, Cairo, Alexandria, and in various cities in the Hejaz. Similarly, many schools were built by his successors also. Their wives and daughters, commanders, and nobles established and financed numerous educational institutions as well.

Although the Ayyubids were from the Shafi'i denomination, they built schools for imparting instruction in all four of the Sunni systems of religious-juridical thought. Before the Ayyubid takeover, there were no schools for the Hanbali and Maliki denominations in Syria, but the Ayyubids founded separate schools for them. In the mid-13th century, Ibn Shaddad counted in Damascus 40 Shafi'i, 34 Hanafi, 10 Hanbali, and three Maliki schools.

When Saladin restored Sunni orthodoxy in Egypt, 10 madrasas were established in Cairo during his reign, and an additional 25 during the entire Ayyubid period of rule. Each of their locations had religious, political, and economic significance, in particular those in al-Fustat. Most of the schools were dedicated to the Shafi'i denomination, but others belonged to the Maliki and Hanafi madhabs. The madrasas built near the tomb of Imam al-Shafi'i were located adjacent to the important centers of pilgrimage and were a major focus of Sunni devotion.

About 26 schools were built in Egypt, Jerusalem and Damascus by high-ranking government officials, and unusual for the time, commoners also founded in Egypt about 18 schools, including two medical institutions. Most schools were residential whereby both teachers and students resided as a rule. The teachers appointed were jurists, theologians, and traditionalists who received their salary from endowments to the institutions they taught in. Each student was offered a lodging where he would resort, a teacher to instruct him in whatever art he requested, and regular grants to cover all his needs. Madrasas were considered prestigious institutions in society. Under the Ayyubids, it was not possible to obtain a job in the government without receiving an education from a madrasa.

== Science and medicine ==
The facilities and patronage provided by the Ayyubids led to a resurgence in intellectual activity in different branches of knowledge and learning throughout the territories they controlled. They took special interest in the fields of medicine, pharmacology, and botany. Saladin built and maintained two hospitals in Cairo emulating the well-known Nuri Hospital in Damascus which not only treated patients, but also provided medical schooling. Many scientists and physicians flourished in this period in Egypt, Syria, and Iraq. Among them were Maimonides, Ibn Jami, Abdul Latif al-Baghdadi, al-Dakhwar, Rashidun al-Suri, and Ibn al-Baitar. Some of these scholars served the Ayyubid household directly, becoming the personal physicians of sultans.

== Architecture ==
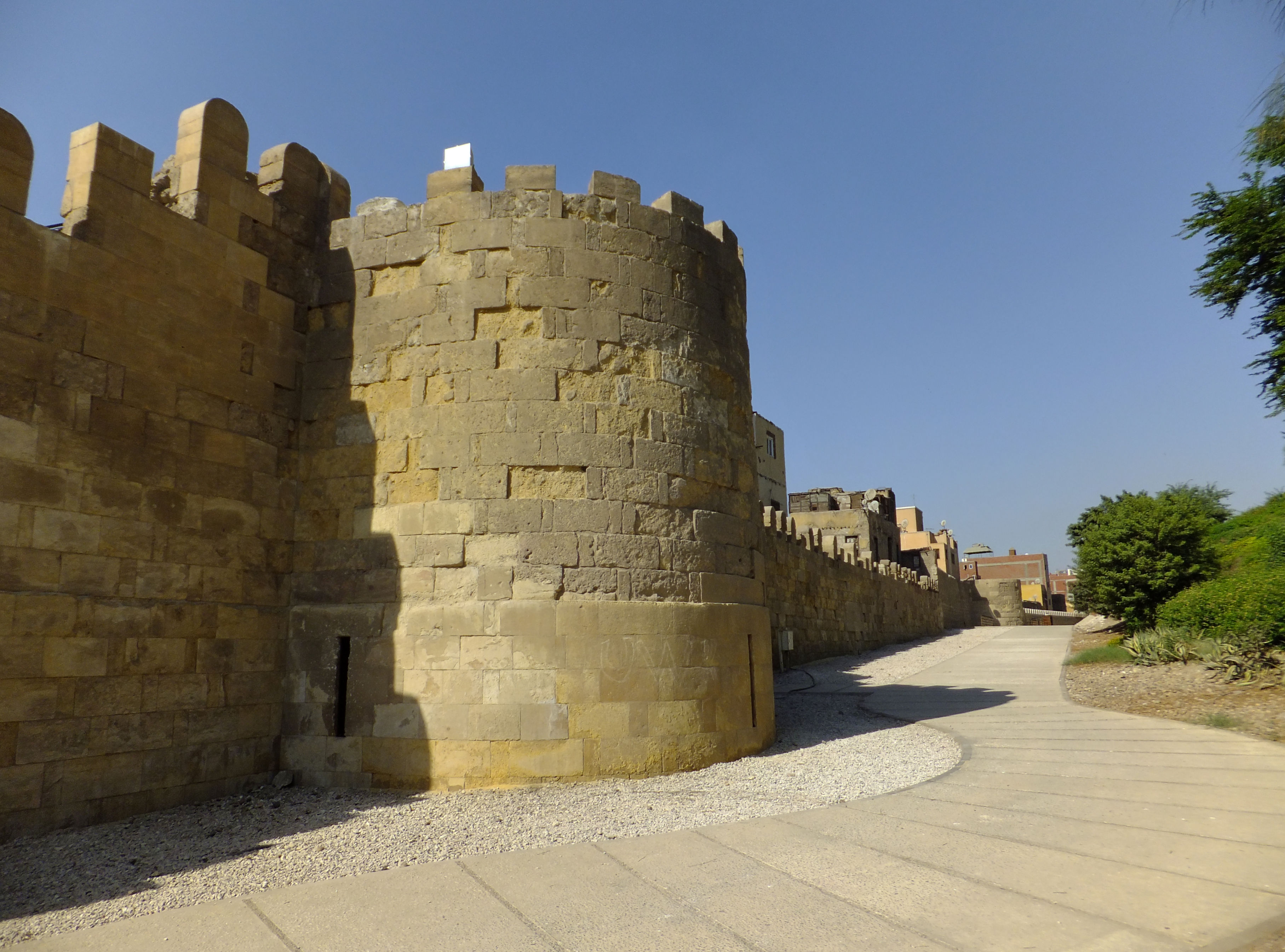
The 12th-century Ayyubid wall of Cairo, as seen from present-day al-Azhar Park. This wall was part of an ambitious fortification project begun by Saladin in 1176 that also included the construction of the Cairo Citadel.

Military architecture was the supreme expression of the Ayyubid period, as well as an eagerness to fortify the restoration of Sunni Islam, especially in a previously Shia-dominated Egypt by constructing Sunni madrasas. The most radical change Saladin implemented in Egypt was the enclosure of Cairo and al-Fustat within one city wall. Some of the techniques of fortification were learned from the Crusaders, such as curtain walls following the natural topography. Many were also inherited from the Fatimids like machicolations and round towers, while other techniques were developed simultaneously by the Ayyubids, particularly concentric planning.

Muslim women, particularly those from the Ayyubid family, the families of local governors, and the families of the ulema ("religious scholars") took an active role in Ayyubid architecture. Damascus witnessed the most sustained patronage of religious architecture by women. They were responsible for the construction of 15 madrasas, six Sufi hospices, and 26 religious and charitable institutions. In Aleppo, the Firdaws Madrasa, known as the most impressive Ayyubid building in Syria, had regent queen Dayfa Khatun as its patron.

In September 1176, construction of the Cairo Citadel began under Saladin's orders. According to al-Maqrizi, Saladin chose the Muqattam Hills to build the citadel because the air there was fresher than anywhere else in the city, but its construction was not so much determined by the salubrious atmosphere; rather it was out of defensive necessity and example of existing fortresses and citadels in Syria. The walls and towers of the northern section of the citadel are largely the works of Saladin and al-Kamil. Al-Kamil completed the citadel; he strengthened and enlarged some of the existing towers (such as two of Saladin's towers that were enlarged by totally encasing them in semi-circular units), and also added a number of square towers which served as self-contained keeps. According to Richard Yeomans, the most impressive of al-Kamil's structures was the series of massive rectangular keeps which straddled the walls of the northern enclosure. All of al-Kamil's fortifications can be identified by their embossed, rusticated masonry, whereas Saladin's towers have smooth dressed stones. This heavier rustic style became a common feature in other Ayyubid fortifications, and can be seen in the Citadel of Damascus and that of Bosra in Syria.

In religious architecture, the Ayyubid period of Egypt marked a new focus on the construction of Sunni madrasas. This was partly motivated by a desire to counter the presence of Shia Islam from the previous two centuries of Fatimid rule. The first madrasa of this kind in Egypt was founded next to the Mausoleum of Imam al-Shafi'i by Salah ad-Din. The mausoleum itself, a large square building covered by a dome, was built in its current form by al-Kamil in 1211 (though the present dome was reconstructed at a later period). The first madrasas seem to have employed a hypostyle design similar to mosques, but later madrasas began to use iwans (vaulted halls open on one side to a courtyard). The earliest known example of the latter is the Madrasa of al-Kamil, founded in 1225.

Decorative techniques and forms in Egypt developed in large part from those of earlier Fatimid architecture, with frequent use of blind and fluted keel-shaped arches on façades, inclusion of carved stucco decoration, and the further development of muqarnas (also known as "stalactite" sculpting). Minarets developed a distinct character, with a square (cuboid) lower shaft and an octagonal upper shaft topped by a lantern-like summit known as mabkhara. Arabic inscriptions in architecture began to shift from the traditional Kufic script to the newer cursive or Naskhi style.

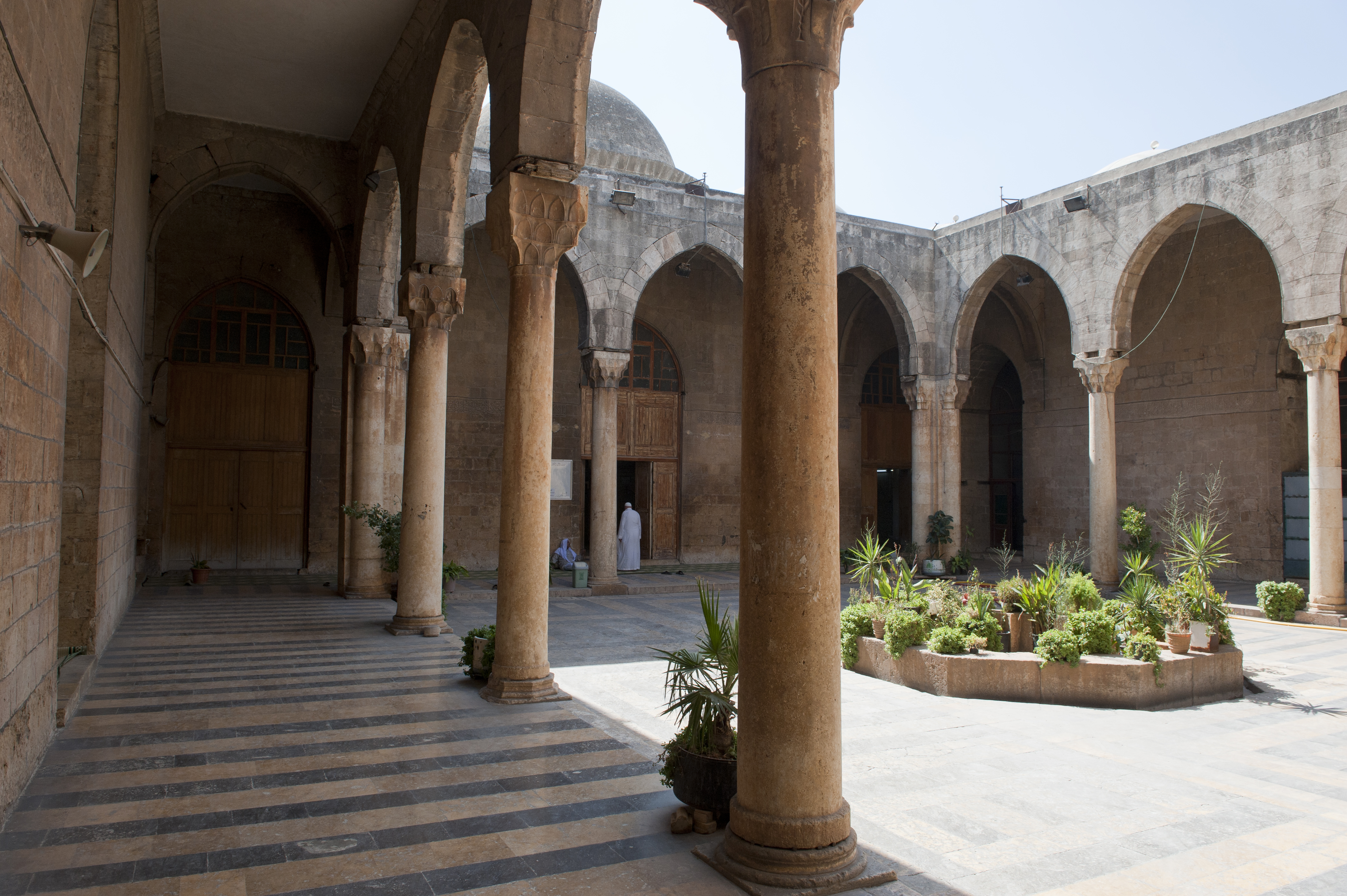
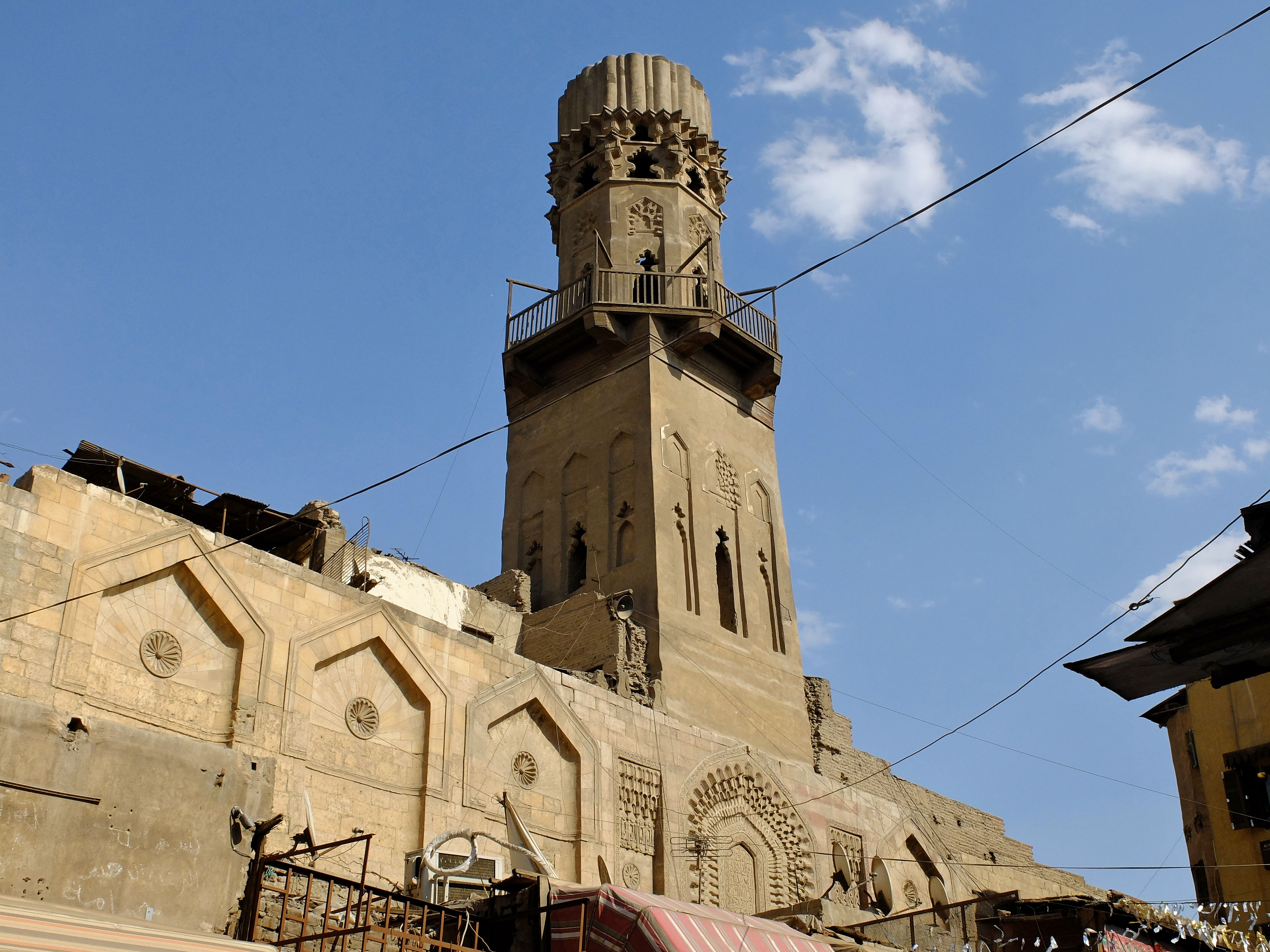
The Firdaws Madrasa (left) was built in 1236 under the patronage of Dayfa Khatun, Aleppo. The minaret and part of the façade of the Madrasa of al-Salih Ayyub (right) in Cairo, built in 1242. The decorative niches on the façade reflect an earlier Fatimid style, but the overall form shows an evolution towards later Cairene minarets.

The end of the Ayyubid period was marked by the creation of the first multi-purpose funerary complexes in Cairo. The last Ayyubid sultan, al-Salih Ayyub, founded the Madrasa al-Salihiyya in 1242. His wife, Shajar ad-Durr, added his mausoleum to it after his death in 1249, and then built her own mausoleum and madrasa complex in 1250 at another location south of the Citadel. These two complexes were the first in Cairo to combine a founder's mausoleum with a religious and charitable complex, which would come to characterize the nature of later Mamluk royal foundations.

Aleppo underwent major transformations in the Ayyubid period, specifically during the reign of az-Zahir Ghazi. Ayyubid architectural achievements focused on four areas: the citadel, the waterworks, fortifications, and the extramural developments. The total rebuilding of the city enclosure began when az-Zahir Ghazi removed the vallum of Nur ad-Din—which by then outlived its temporary need—and rebuilt the northern and northwestern walls—the most susceptible to outside attack—from Bab al-Jinan to Bab al-Nasr. He parceled out the building of the towers on this stretch of the wall to his princes and military officers; each tower was identified with a particular prince who inscribed his name into it. Later, az-Zahir Ghazi extended the eastern wall to the south and east, reflecting his desire to incorporate a dilapidated fortress, Qala'at al-Sharif, outside the city into Aleppo's enclosure. Bab Qinnasrin was completely rebuilt by an-Nasir Yusuf in 1256. This gate stands today as a masterpiece of medieval Syrian military architecture. Cumulatively, Ayyubid architecture left a lasting impression in Aleppo. The citadel was rebuilt, the water network was expanded, and streets and quarters were provided fountains and baths. In addition, dozens of shrines, mosques, madrasas, and mausoleums were built throughout the city.

The Ayyubid period in Jerusalem following its conquest by Saladin was marked by a huge investment in the construction of houses, markets, public bathes, and pilgrim hostels. Numerous works were undertaken at the Al-Aqsa Mosque compound. Saladin ordered all the inner walls and pillars of the Dome of the Rock to be covered in marble and he initiated the renovation of the mosaics on the dome's drum. The mihrab of the al-Aqsa Mosque was repaired and in 1217, al-Mu'azzam Isa built the northern porch of the mosque with three gates. The Dome of the Ascension was also built and restoration work was done to the existing free-standing domes of the Al-Aqsa Mosque compound.

== See also ==
- List of Kurdish dynasties and countries
- List of Sunni dynasties

== Bibliography ==
- Abun-Nasr, Jamil (1987). A history of the Maghrib in the Islamic period. Cambridge: Cambridge University Press. ISBN 0521337674.
- Angold, Michael, ed. (2006), The Cambridge History of Christianity: Volume 5, Eastern Christianity, Cambridge University Press, ISBN 978-0-521-81113-2
- Ayliffe, Rosie; Dubin, Marc; Gawthrop, John; Richardson, Terry (2003), The Rough Guide to Turkey, Rough Guides, ISBN 978-1-84353-071-8
- Ali, Abdul (1996), Islamic Dynasties of the Arab East: State and Civilization During the Later Medieval Times, M.D. Publications Pvt. Ltd, ISBN 978-81-7533-008-5
- Baadj, Amar S. (2015). Saladin, the Almohads and the Banū Ghāniya: The Contest for North Africa (12th and 13th centuries). Brill. ISBN 978-90-04-29857-6.
- Baer, Eva (1989), Ayyubid Metalwork with Christian Images, Brill, ISBN 978-90-04-08962-4
- Brice, William Charles (1981), An Historical Atlas of Islam, Brill, ISBN 978-90-04-06116-3
- Bajalan, Djene Rhys; Karimi, Sara Zandi (2017). Studies in Kurdish History: Empire, Ethnicity and Identity. Paris: Taylor & Francis. ISBN 978-2296001053.
- Burns, Ross (2005), Damascus: A History, Routledge, ISBN 978-0-415-27105-9
- Bosworth, C.E. (1996), The New Islamic Dynasties, New York: Columbia University Press, ISBN 978-0-231-10714-3
- Catlos, Brian (1997), "Mamluks", in Rodriguez, Junios P. (ed.), The Historical Encyclopedia of World Slavery, vol. 1, 7, ABC-CLIO, ISBN 978-0-87436-885-7
- Daly, M. W.; Petry, Carl F. (1998), The Cambridge History of Egypt: Islamic Egypt, 640–1517, M.D. Publications Pvt. Ltd, ISBN 978-81-7533-008-5
- Dumper, Michael R.T.; Stanley, Bruce E., eds. (2007), Cities of the Middle East and North Africa: A Historical Encyclopedia, ABC-CLIO, ISBN 978-1-57607-919-5
- Eiselen, Frederick Carl (1907), Sidon: A Study in Oriental History, New York: Columbia University Press
- Fage, J. D., ed. (1978), The Cambridge History of Africa, Volume 2: c. 500 B.C.–A.D. 1050, Cambridge University Press, ISBN 978-0-52121-592-3
- Flinterman, Willem (April 2012), "Killing and Kinging" (PDF), Leidschrift, 27 (1), archived (PDF) from the original on 2015-02-12
- Fage, J. D.; Oliver, Roland, eds. (1977), The Cambridge History of Africa, Volume 3: c. 1050–c. 1600, Cambridge University Press, ISBN 978-0-521-20981-6
- France, John (1998), The Crusades and Their Sources: Essays Presented to Bernard Hamilton, Ashgate, ISBN 978-0-86078-624-5
- Goldschmidt, Arthur (2008), A Brief History of Egypt, Infobase Publishing, ISBN 978-1-4381-0824-7
- Grousset, René (2002) [1970], The Empire of the Steppes: A History of Central Asia, Rutgers University Press, ISBN 978-0-8135-1304-1
- Irwin, Robert (1999). "The rise of the Mamluks". In Abulafia, David (ed.). The New Cambridge Medieval History, Volume 5, c.1198–c.1300. Cambridge: Cambridge University Press. pp. 607–621. ISBN 978-1-13905573-4.
- Hourani, Albert Habib; Ruthven, Malise (2002), A History of the Arab peoples, Harvard University Press, ISBN 978-0-674-01017-8
- Houtsma, Martijn Theodoor; Wensinck, A.J. (1993), E.J. Brill's First Encyclopaedia of Islam, 1913–1936, Brill, ISBN 978-90-04-09796-4
- Humphreys, Stephen (1977), From Saladin to the Mongols: The Ayyubids of Damascus, 1193–1260, SUNY Press, ISBN 978-0-87395-263-7
- Öpengin, Ergin (2021). "The History of Kurdish and the Development of Literary Kurmanji". In Bozarslan, Hamit; Gunes, Cengiz; Yadirgi, Veli (eds.). The Cambridge History of the Kurds. Cambridge University Press.
- Humphreys, R. S. (1987). "Ayyubids". Encyclopaedia Iranica, Vol. III, Fasc. 2. pp. 164–167.
- Humphreys, R.S. (1991). "Masūd b. Mawdūd b. Zangī". In Bosworth, C. E.; van Donzel, E. & Pellat, Ch. (eds.). The Encyclopaedia of Islam, Second Edition. Volume VI: Mahk–Mid. Leiden: E. J. Brill. pp. 780–782. ISBN 978-90-04-08112-3.
- Humphreys, Stephen (1994), "Women as Patrons of Religious Architecture in Ayyubid Damascus", Muqarnas, 11: 35–54, doi:10.2307/1523208, JSTOR 1523208
- Jackson, Sherman A. (1996), Islamic Law and the State, Brill, ISBN 978-90-04-10458-7
- Lane-Poole, Stanley (1906), Saladin and the Fall of the Kingdom of Jerusalem, Heroes of the Nations, London: G. P. Putnam's Sons
- Lane-Poole, Stanley (2004) [1894], The Mohammedan Dynasties: Chronological and Genealogical Tables with Historical Introductions, Kessinger Publishing, ISBN 978-1-4179-4570-2
- Lev, Yaacov (1999). Saladin in Egypt. Leiden, Boston, Köln: Brill. ISBN 90-04-11221-9.
- Lofgren, O. (1960). "ʿAdan". In Gibb, H. A. R.; Kramers, J. H.; Lévi-Provençal, E.; Schacht, J.; Lewis, B. & Pellat, Ch. (eds.). The Encyclopaedia of Islam, Second Edition. Volume I: A–B. Leiden: E. J. Brill. OCLC 495469456.
- Lyons, M. C.; Jackson, D.E.P. (1982), Saladin: the Politics of the Holy War, Cambridge University Press, ISBN 978-0-521-31739-9
- Magill, Frank Northen (1998), Dictionary of World Biography: The Middle Ages, vol. 2, Routledge, ISBN 978-1-57958-041-4
- Ma'oz, Moshe; Nusseibeh, Sari (2000), Jerusalem: Points of Friction - And Beyond, Brill, ISBN 978-90-41-18843-4
- Margariti, Roxani Eleni (2007), Aden & the Indian Ocean trade: 150 years in the life of a medieval Arabian port, UNC Press, ISBN 978-0-8078-3076-5
- McLaughlin, Daniel (2008), Yemen: The Bradt Travel Guide, Bradt Travel Guides, ISBN 978-1-84162-212-5
- Meri, Josef W.; Bacharach, Jeri L. (2006), Medieval Islamic civilization: An Encyclopedia, Taylor and Francis, ISBN 978-0-415-96691-7
- Nicolle, David (2011). Saladin. Bloomsbury Publishing. ISBN 978-1-84908-318-8.
- Özoğlu, Hakan (2004), Kurdish Notables and the Ottoman State: Evolving Identities, Competing Loyalties, and Shifting Boundaries, SUNY Press, ISBN 978-0-7914-5994-2
- Petersen, Andrew (1996), Dictionary of Islamic Architecture, Routledge, ISBN 978-0-415-06084-4
- Rabbat, Nasser O. (1995). The Citadel of Cairo: A New Interpretation of Royal Mamluk Architecture. Brill. ISBN 978-90-04-10124-1.
- Raymond, André (2000) [1993]. Cairo. Translated by Wood, Willard. Harvard University Press. ISBN 978-0-674-00316-3.
- Richard, Jean; Birrell, Jean (1999), The Crusades, c. 1071–c. 1291, Cambridge University Press, ISBN 978-0-521-62566-1
- Salibi, Kamal S. (1998), The Modern History of Jordan, I.B. Tauris, ISBN 978-1-86064-331-6
- Sato, Tsugitaka (2014), Sugar in the Social Life of Medieval Islam, Brill, ISBN 978-90-04-28156-1
- Shatzmiller, Maya (1994), Labour in the Medieval Islamic world, Brill, ISBN 978-90-04-09896-1
- Shillington, Kevin (2005), Encyclopedia of African history, CRC Press, ISBN 978-1-57958-453-5
- Singh, Nagendra Kumar (2000), International Encyclopaedia of Islamic Dynasties, Anmol Publications PVT. LTD., ISBN 978-81-261-0403-1
- Smail, R.C. (1995), Crusading Warfare 1097–1193, Barnes & Noble Books, ISBN 978-1-56619-769-4
- le Strange, Guy (1890), Palestine Under the Moslems: A Description of Syria and the Holy Land from A.D. 650 to 1500, Committee of the Palestine Exploration Fund
- Taagepera, Rein (1997). "Expansion and Contraction Patterns of Large Polities: Context for Russia" (PDF). International Studies Quarterly. 41 (3): 475–504. doi:10.1111/0020-8833.00053. JSTOR 2600793.
- Tabbaa, Yasser (1997), Constructions of Power and Piety in Medieval Aleppo, Penn State Press, ISBN 978-0-271-01562-0
- Turchin, Peter; Adams, Jonathan M.; Hall, Thomas D. (December 2006), "East-West Orientation of Historical Empires", Journal of World-Systems Research, 12 (2): 219–229, doi:10.5195/JWSR.2006.369
- Vermeulen, Urbaine; De Smet, D.; Van Steenbergen, J. (2001), Egypt and Syria in the Fatimid, Ayyubid, and Mamluk eras III, Peeters Publishers, ISBN 978-90-429-0970-0
- Willey, Peter (2005), Eagle's nest: Ismaili castles in Iran and Syria, Institute of Ismaili Studies and I.B. Tauris, ISBN 978-1-85043-464-1
- Williams, Caroline (2018). Islamic Monuments in Cairo: The Practical Guide (7th ed.). Cairo: The American University in Cairo Press. ISBN 9789774168550.
- Yeomans, Richard (2006), The Art and Architecture of Islamic Cairo, Garnet & Ithaca Press, ISBN 978-1-85964-154-5

— Royal house — Ayyubid dynasty
| Preceded by Fatimid dynasty | Ruling house of Egypt; 1171–1254 as Abbasid autonomy | Succeeded by Bahri dynasty |
