= Pope Athanasius III of Alexandria =

Head of the Coptic Church from 1250 to 1261

- Pope of Alexandria and Patriarch of the See of St. Mark
- Papacy began: 9 October 1250 AD
- Papacy ended: 27 November 1261 AD
- Predecessor: Cyril III
- Successor: John VII

Orders
- Ordination: 9 October 1250 AD
- Consecration: 9 October 1250 AD

Personal details
- Born: Egypt
- Died: 27 November 1261 AD Egypt
- Buried: Saint Mercurius Church in Coptic Cairo
- Denomination: Coptic Orthodox Christian
- Residence: The Hanging Church

Pope Athanasius III of Alexandria, 76th Pope of Alexandria and Patriarch of the See of St. Mark.

He was known as Athanasius ibn Kalil (البابا أثناسيوس الثالث ابن كليل). His episcopate lasted for eleven years, one month and 18 days from Sunday 9 October 1250 (12 Babah/Paopi 967 AM) to 27 November 1261 AD (The first of Kiahk/Koiahk 978 AM).

The See of St Mark remained vacant for one month and 5 days after his death and he was succeeded by Pope John VII of Alexandria. He was buried in Saint Mercurius Church in Coptic Cairo (كنيسة مرقوريوس أبو سيفين).

In his time, the Papal Residence was at the Church of The Holy Virgin Mary & St Damiana known as The Hanging Church (الكنيسة المعلقة) in Coptic Cairo.

== Contemporary rulers of Egypt during his episcopate ==
The episcopate of Pope Athanasius III of Alexandria started at the time when the Ayyubid Dynasty (الأيوبيون) (1171 -1250 AD) lost power to their slave troops (Mamluks) in Egypt (1250 AD) and elsewhere (1260 AD). The Bahriyya Mamluks (al-Mamalik al-Bahariyya - المماليك البحرية) was a Mamluk dynasty of mostly Turkic origin that ruled the Egyptian Mamluk Sultanate from 1250 to 1382. They were succeeded by a second Mamluk dynasty, the Burji dynasty (1382-1517 AD). Their name "Bahriyya" means 'of the river', referring to the location of their original settlement on Al-Rodah Island in the Nile (Nahr al-Nil) in Medieval Cairo at the castle of Al-Rodah which was built by the Ayyubid Sultan as-Salih Ayyub(الملك الصالح نجم الدين ايوب) (reign 1240 – 22 November 1249)

Pope Athanasius III of Alexandria became the patriarch at the time of the reign of Al-Ashraf Musa, Sultan of Egypt (الأشرف موسى) who was the last, albeit titular, Ayyubid Sultan of Egypt (ruled July 1250 – 1254 AD). Al-Ashraf Musa was the puppet of the strong Mamluk ruler Izz ad-Din Aybak.

Thus, the episcopate of Pope Athanasius III of Alexandria coincided with the following rulers: Al-Ashraf Musa, Sultan of Egypt(الأشرف موسى), Izz al-Din Aybak (عز الدين أيبك), Al-Mansur Ali ( نور الدين على بن أيبك), Qutuz (قطز), and Baibars (بيبرس). Below is a tabulation of the periods of reign of various rules of Egypt at the time.

2 May 1250–July 1250 AD: Shajar al-Durr (شجر الدر, "Tree of Pearls") whose Royal Name was al-Malika `Aṣmat ad-Dīn Umm-Khalīl Shajar ad-Durr (الملكة عصمة الدين أم خليل شجر الدر) (nicknamed: أم خليل, Umm Khalil; mother of Khalil) (died 28 April 1257 in Cairo). She was the wife of Sultan al-Malik As-Salih Ayyub (الملك الصالح نجم الدين ايوب), Egypt's Sultan of the Ayyubid dynasty and later married Izz al-Din Aybak, Egypt Sultan of the Bahri Mamluk dynasty. Aybak married her to claim access to the throne. Shajar al-Durr played a crucial role after the death of her first husband in Al-Mansura (22 November 1249) during the Seventh Crusade (1249–1250). She became the Sultana of Egypt on May 2, 1250 (648 AH), marking the end of the Ayyubid reign and the start of the Mamluk era. Her reign was short, lasting under three months. Many Muslim historians believed that she was of Turkic origin and some believed that she was of Armenian origin

July 1250 AD (five days, first Reign): Mamluk Sultan al-Muizz Izz al-Din Aybak (1250-1257 AD, 648-655 AH, Assassinated) (الملك المعز عز الدين أيبك التركماني الجاشنكير) - His official reign was from 1254-1257 AD, however, he was the de facto ruler since 1250 AD.

July 1250 – 1254 AD: Ayyubid Sultan (al-Malik) al-Ashraf II Muzaffar ad-Din [Musa Al-Asharf موسى الأشرف, (reign 1250-1254 AD / 648-650 AH)]. Al-Ashraf Musa (الأشرف موسى) was the last, albeit titular, Ayyubid Sultan of Egypt. Al-Ashraf Musa, Sultan of Egypt, was the puppet of the strong Mamluk ruler Izz ad-Din Aybak.

1254- 1257 AD: Mamluk Sultan al-Malik al-Mu'izz Izz al-Din Aybak al-Jawshangir al-Turkmani al-Salihi (1250-1257 AD, 648-655 AH, Assassinated) (الملك المعز عز الدين أيبك التركماني الجاشنكير) - His official reign was from 1254-1257 AD, however, he was the de facto ruler since 1250 AD. Izz al-Din Aybak (عز الدين أيبك) was the first of the Mamluk sultans of Egypt in the Turkic Bahri line, if the reign of Shajar al-Durr is discounted.

1257-November 1259 AD: Mamluk Sultan Al-Malik Al-Manṣūr Nūr ad-dīn ʾAlī ibn Aybak (1257-1259 AD, 655-657 AH, Dethroned) (الملك المنصور نور الدين على بن أيبك). Al-Mansur Ali (المنصور على) (b. c. 1244, Cairo) was the second of the Mamluk Sultans of Egypt in the Turkic, or Bahri, line. Some historians, however, consider Shajar al-Durr as the first of the Mamluk Sultans; thus, Al-Mansur Ali was the third Mamluk Sultan He ruled from 1257 to 1259 after the assassination of his father Aybak during a turbulent period that witnessed the Mongols invasion of the Islamic world.

November 1259-24 October 1260 AD: The Reign of Mamluk Sultan al-Malik al-Muzafar Seif al-Din Qutuz (1259-1260 AD, Assassinated) (لملك المظفر سيف الدين قطز). (Arabic: سيف الدين قطز; d. 24 October 1260). Under his leadership, the Mamluks defeated the Mongols in the key Battle of Ain Jalut (3 September 1260). Qutuz was assassinated by a fellow Mamluk leader, Baibars, on his triumphant return journey to Cairo.

24 October 1260 - 1 July 1277 AD: The Reign of Mamluk Sultan al-Zahir Rukn al-Din Baibars (Baybars) I al-Bunduqdari (1260-1277 AD, 658-665 AH, died in office)(الملك الظاهر ركن الدين بيبرس البندقداري) nicknamed Abu al-Futuh and Abu l-Futuhat (أبو الفتوح; "Father of Conquest", referring to his victories) — He was one of the commanders of the Muslim forces that defeated King Louis IX of France to end the Seventh Crusade (1248 to 1254). Louis IX was defeated by the Ayyubid Sultan Al-Muazzam Turanshah, supported by Faris ad-Din Aktai's Bahariyya Mamluks, Baibars al-Bunduqdari, Qutuz, Aybak, and Al-Mansur Qalawun. Louis was taken prisoner, and approximately 800,000 bezants were paid in ransom for his release. Baibars also led the vanguard of the army at the Battle of Ain Jalut in 1260, which marked the first substantial defeat of the Mongol army and is considered a turning point in history. The reign of Baibars marked the start of the age of Mamluk dominance in the Eastern Mediterranean and solidified the durability of their military system. He managed to pave the way for the end of the Crusader presence in the Levant and reinforced the union of Egypt and Syria as the region's pre-eminent Muslim state, able to fend off threats from both Crusaders and Mongols, and even managed to subdue the kingdom of Makuria (in the Sudan), which was famous for being unconquerable by previous Muslim empire invasion attempts. This marks the start of the spread of Islam south of Egypt.

== Brief Biography ==
After the repose of Pope Cyril III of Alexandria (Cyril III ibn Laqlaq)) 75th Pope of Alexandria & Patriarch of the See of St. Mark, on 10 March 1243 AD, the Episcopal See of St Mark remained vacant for seven and a half years. The Copts were obliged to pay a fee of 3000 dinars every time they ordain a new Pope, which was a prohibitive sum. However, when Sultan Ezzeddin Aybak ((الملك المعز عز الدين أيبك التركماني الجاشنكير)) became the de facto ruler in 1250 AD, the Copts offered him a gift of 500 dinars for the purpose of this ordination, and he accepted it. Moreover, it seems that this was the last time that such a fee was imposed, as there is no record in history that the Copts had to pay this fee again.

The person selected for the Patriarchate was a priest and a monk from the Monastery of St Anthony in the Eastern Desert. His name was Paul ibn Kalil al-Masri (القس بولس الراهب الأنطوني المعروف بابن كليل المصري). He was a deacon and the son of a priest and then he became a monk and priest under the name Paul (القس بولس بن كليل) and was nicknamed "the son of Rev. Makarim ben Kalil"(ولد القس مكارم بن كليل). He was selected over a priest and monk named Gabriel, who was a relative of Bishop Abba Peter of Tanbadi (بطرس أسقف طنبدي), who was hoping for the position, supported by the children of Al-Assal (أولاد العسال), but the people rejected Gabriel the monk. Bishop Abba Yousab of Fouh and Upper Menouf the author of a useful work on Church History (الأنبا يوساب صاحب التاريخ أسقف فوه ومنوف العليا) played an important role in establishing the ordination of the priest Paul ibn Kalil the monk, and finally all agreed on his ordination.

When he was chosen for the patriarchate, he was promoted to the rank of Hegumen ( درجة الإيغومانوسية) of the Hanging Church (الكنيسة المعلقة) in Cairo on Sunday 2 October 1250 AD (5 Baba 967 AM) with great glory and celebration. After being promoted to the rank of Hegumen in Cairo, he traveled with the bishops, the senior clergy, and the Coptic leaders to Alexandria to complete his ordination as Patriarch, as was the custom. There, he was consecrated Patriarch in the Church of Sotir (the Church of the Savior) in Alexandria (كنيسة الستوتير- كنيسة المخلص) a week later on Sunday 9 October 1250 AD.

At the time of the ordination of Pope Athanasius III, the Vizier Sharafuddin Abi Said the son of Sa'id al-Nayizi (الوزير شرف الدين أبي سعيد هبة الله بن صاعد النايزي) was present in Alexandria. The Pope met with him, and the Vizier received him for a long reception. Before leaving Alexandria, the new pope consecrated several churches and ordained a number of priests. He then headed to monasteries of Nitria (Wadi al-Natroun, وادي النطرون), as was the custom of the new patriarchs when they were ordained.

In the year 1257 AD (973 AM), Pope Athanasius III consecrated the Holy Oil of Chrismation (the Myron, الميرون) in the monastery of St Macarius (Abi Makar, دير أبي مقار). The consecration was attended by several bishops. They included Bishop Abba Yoannis of Samannoud (الأنبا يوأنس أسقف سمنود), Bishop Abba Gregorius of Mahalla (أنبا غريغوريوس أسقف المحلة), Bishop Mikhail of El-Baramon (أنبا ميخائيل أسقف البرمون), Bishop Abba Yousab of Fouh and Upper Menouf the author of a useful work on Church History ((الأنبا يوساب صاحب التاريخ أسقف فوه ومنوف العليا), Bishop Abba Abraam of Nestroh (أنبا ابرآم أسقف نستروة), Bishop Abba Boutros of Sinjar (أنبا بطرس أسقف سنجار), Bishop Abba Youanes of Laqana (أنبا يؤانس أسقف لقانة), Bishop Abba Mark of Dafri (أنبا مرقس أسقف دفري), Bishop Abba Yoannis ibn Al-Khazen of Abu Tig (أنبا يوأنس ابن الخازن أسقف أبو تيج), Bishop Abba Yusab of Akhmim (أنبا يوساب أسقف أخميم), Bishop Abba Boutros (Peter) of Fayoum (أنبا بطرس أسقف الفيوم), and (12) Bishop Abba Youannis (John) of Al-Bahnasa (Oxyrhynchus) (أنبا يوانس ابن الراهبة أسقف البهنسا).

He struggled during his episcopate for peace within the Church and struggled against the ill effects of Simony (acquisition of the priesthood with money). When he became patriarch, he attempted everything within his power to heal the church and repair the damage caused by his predecessor, Cyril III (البابا كيرلس بن لقلق). He pressed hard on the bishops who ascended to the episcopate by the Simeonite way, the manner in which Pope Cyril III sold the various positions of the episcopate. Because of this, Many Coptic bishops left the Orthodox faith.

In his days, a governor official named Assaad Sharaf al-Din Hibatullah bin Sa'ad al-Nayzi (الوزير الأسعد شرف الدين هبة الله بن صاعد النايزي), who used to be a Coptic Christian (قبطي الأصل), charged the Christians double the allocated taxation.

In his days also, the Muslims rioted in Damascus and destroyed the Church of the Virgin Mary after burning and looting what was in it (Al-Maqrizi, part 4, p. 402).

Also in the year 1259 AD (976 AM), a group of Christians were killed in Damascus and their homes were looted just before the Battle of Ain Jalut. Following the Battle of Ain Jalut and the defeat of the Mongols, the Mamluk Sultan al-Malik al-Muzafar Seif al-Din Qutuz entered Damascus, and ordered the Christians to pay 150,000 Dirhams, which collected from them and carried to him by the Embassy of the Persian Prince Farisuddin Aktay (الأمير الفارسي فارس الدين أقطاي المستعرب أتابك المعسكر). There was a large Coptic presence in Damascus in these days, and they had many Coptic Churches in Damascus.

Preceded by Cyril III	Coptic Pope; 1250–1261	Succeeded by John VII
