= Pope Cyril III of Alexandria =

Head of the Coptic Church from 1235 to 1243

- Pope of Alexandria and Patriarch of the See of St. Mark
- Papacy began: 17 June 1235
- Papacy ended: 10 March 1243
- Predecessor: John VI
- Successor: Athanasius III

Orders
- Ordination: 17 June 1235
- Consecration: 17 June 1235

Personal details
- Born: David Ibn Laqlaq of Fayyum (داود ابن لقلق الفيومي); ~ 1175 AD Fayyum, Egypt
- Died: 10 March 1243 Cairo, Egypt
- Buried: Wax (El-Shamaa) Monastery (دير الشمع في الجيزة)
- Denomination: Coptic Orthodox Christian
- Residence: The Hanging Church

Cyril III, known as Cyril ibn Laqlaq (Arabic: كيرلس الثالث ابن لقلق, romanized: Kīrulus ibn Laqlaq), was the 75th Coptic Orthodox Pope and Patriarch of Alexandria.

His episcopate lasted seven years, eight months, and 23 days from Sunday, 17 June 1235 (23 Paoni 951 A.M.) to Tuesday, 10 March 1243 (14 Baramhat 959 A.M.). Before his ordination, the Episcopal Seat was vacant for 19 years, partly due to the competition between the three candidates vying for the position, including ibn Laqlaq himself. His ordination was controversial, and he is remembered as a lover of money who did not ordain a bishop, a priest, or a deacon without getting paid, a practice called simony.

In 1238, he issued a new set of canons for the Coptic church and its dependencies in Ethiopia, Nubia, and Cyrenaica.

The See of St Mark remained vacant for seven years, six months, and 28 days after Cyril ibn Laqlaq's death until he was succeeded by Pope Athanasius III of Alexandria on Sunday, 9 October 1250 AD. The Apostolic Throne remained vacant because intense persecution did not allow the Copts to elect a successor. Cyril ibn Laqlaq was buried in the Wax Monastery in Giza (دير الشمع في الجيزة). In his time, the Papal Residence was located at the Hanging Church in Coptic Cairo.

== Contemporary rulers of Egypt during his episcopate ==
The episcopate of Cyril III ibn Laqlaq started on 17 June 1235 AD and ended on 10 March 1243 AD, but the Episcopal Seat had been vacant for 19 years before his consecration (i.e. since 1216 AD), in part due to the competition between the three candidates vying for the position including ibn Laqlaq. Additionally, the Episcopal Seat remained vacant after the death of ibn Laqlaq for almost seven years and seven months until the consecration of his successor Pope Athanasius III of Alexandria on 9 October 1250 AD. The 34 years that had passed from the death of his predecessor, Pope John VI of Alexandria, the 74th Pope of Alexandria, in 1216 AD to his own death in 1243, and to the later consecration of his successor Pope Athanasius III of Alexandria in 1250 AD saw the reign of Egypt come under the following rules:

1200 – August 1218 AD: The fourth Ayyubid Sultan of Egypt and Syria Al-Adil I - (الملك العادل, al-Malik al-Adil Sayf ad-Din Abu-Bakr Ahmed ibn Najm ad-Din Ayyub, الملك العادل سيف الدين أبو بكر بن أيوب; born 1145– died 1218 AD). From his honorific title Sayf ad-Din ("Sword of Faith"), he was known to the Frankish Crusaders as Saphadin. He was a gifted and effective administrator and a capable general and strategist who provided crucial military and civilian support for the great campaigns of his brother Saladin. The foundation and persistence of the Ayyubid Sultanate was as much his achievement as Saladin's.

1218 – 6 March 1238 AD: The fifth Ayyubid Sultan of Egypt and Syria Al-Kamil - (الملك الكامل). During his tenure as Sultan, the Ayyubids defeated the Fifth Crusade (1213–1221 AD). He was known to the Frankish Crusaders as Meledin. He was defeated in the Sixth Crusade however, and as a result, he ceded Jerusalem. He his famous in Western history for his cordial meeting in 1219 AD with Saint Francis, as apparently he thought that Saint Francis was an embassy of the Crusaders to reach a settlement.

6 March 1238 – 1240 AD: The sixth Ayyubid Sultan of Egypt and Syria Al-Adil II - (الملك العادل أبو بكر بن الكامل) (Al-Malik al-ʿĀdil Sayf ad-Dīn Abū Bakr ibn Nāṣir ad-Dīn Muḥammad - سيف الدين الملك العادل أبو بكر بن ناصر الدين محمد) (born c. 1221 – died 9 February 1248). When his father al-Kamil, nephew of Saladin, died in 1238, al-Adil II followed him somewhat unprepared. When the country plunged into anarchy, his exiled half-brother, as-Salih Ayyub, seized the opportunity and deposed him. Al-Adil died in prison eight years later (In 1248 AD).

1240 – 22 November 1249 AD: The seventh Ayyubid Sultan of Egypt and Syria As-Salih Ayyub - Al-Malik as-Salih Najm al-Din Ayyub (الملك الصالح نجم الدين ايوب). He was born in Cairo on 5 November 1205 and died 22 November 1249 in Al Mansurah during the siege of Al Mansurah during the Seventh Crusade (1249–1250) led by Louis IX of France. As-Salih Ayyub is nicknamed Abu al-Futuh (أبو الفتوح).

2 May 1250–July 1250 AD: Shajar al-Durr (شجر الدر, "Tree of Pearls") whose Royal Name was al-Malika `Aṣmat ad-Dīn Umm-Khalīl Shajar ad-Durr (الملكة عصمة الدين أم خليل شجر الدر) (nicknamed: أم خليل, Umm Khalil; mother of Khalil) (died 28 April 1257 in Cairo). She was the wife of Sultan al-Malik As-Salih Ayyub (الملك الصالح نجم الدين ايوب), Egypt's seventh Ayyubid Sultan and later married Izz al-Din Aybak, Egypt's Sultan of the Bahri Mamluk dynasty. Aybak married her to claim access to the throne. Shajar al-Durr played a crucial role after the death of her first husband in Al-Mansura (22 November 1249) during the Seventh Crusade (1249–1250). She became the Sultana of Egypt on May 2, 1250 (648 AH), marking the end of the Ayyubid reign and the start of the Mamluk era. Her reign was short, lasting under three months. Many Muslim historians believed that she was of Turkic origin and some believed that she was of Armenian origin

July 1250 AD (five days, first Reign): Mamluk Sultan al-Muizz Izz al-Din Aybak (1250-1257 AD, 648-655 AH, Assassinated) (الملك المعز عز الدين أيبك التركماني الجاشنكير) - His official reign was from 1254 to 1257 AD, however, he was the de facto ruler since 1250 AD.

July 1250 – 1254 AD: Ayyubid Sultan (al-Malik) al-Ashraf II Muzaffar ad-Din [Musa Al-Asharf موسى الأشرف, (reign 1250-1254 AD / 648-650 AH)]. Al-Ashraf Musa (الأشرف موسى) was the last, albeit titular, Ayyubid Sultan of Egypt. Al-Ashraf Musa, Sultan of Egypt, was the puppet of the strong Mamluk ruler Izz ad-Din Aybak.

The Episcopate of Pope Cyril III of Alexandria (1235-1243) fell during the reigns of Al-Kamil(الملك الكامل)(1218-1238 AD), Al-Adil II (الملك العادل الثاني)(1238-1240), and his brother As-Salih Ayyub (الملك الصالح) (1240-1249).

== Ordination ==
His predecessor, Pope John VI of Alexandria, the 74th Pope of Alexandria, died in 1216 in grief over the conversion of the entire population of Pentapolis in Eastern Libya from Christianity to Islam, even though he had ordained a bishop for Pentapolis (the five western cities) after a long period where there was no bishop for this area (in hopes of strengthening the church there). John VI came from a rich family before his ordination, but he lived a simple life and used his family wealth to pay for his expenses and for the expenses of the Patriarchate and those of his aids. He did not want to burden the church or its people with his expenses, but he lived all his days supporting himself and his companions, and he gave charity to the poor of his own money and refused to answer the demands of the Church leaders in Alexandria for payments out of the church coffers (as was the custom before him). Thus, in his time, sufficient money accumulated in the Church coffers. This attracted the attention of a powerful monk and a priest named David (Dawoud) of Fayyum ibn Laqlaq (داود بن لقلق - داود الفيومي) who desired to seize this money. John VI was patriarch for 27 years [1189-1216 AD]. This simple pope had predicted before his departure that "pain would befall the church and its people and the Lord would establish a man who would come from where they did not know". John VI died unhappy about the state of affairs of the Church and wary of the plans of Dawoud ibn Laqlaq.

The ordination of Cyril ibn Laqlaq was controversial. On the very day that John VI died, supporters of the priest and monk David of Fayyum (داود الفيومي) started lobbying for his consecration as patriarch, on his behest. However, there was severe opposition to his consecration. The selection of David of Fayyum was supported by many powerful individuals including the Ayyubite Sultan Al-Adil (reigned 1200-1218 AD, الملك العادل) There was a deadlock in reaching a decision but the supporters of David of Fayyum (داود الفيومي) were powerful enough to block the selection of any other candidate. Thus, the Episcopal seat remained vacant for 19 years. This is the longest vacancy of the Seat of the Bishop of Alexandria in the history of the Coptic Orthodox Church. Finally, David of Fayyum (داود الفيومي) was selected as Patriarch against the opposition of many.

Due to his influence before he became the Pope it was not possible to ordain any other person except him, which led to about nineteen years of vacancy of that important post. This is the longest vacancy in the history of the Coptic Orthodox Church.

== Jerusalem's Coptic Bishop ==
Cyril used the increasing military and political power of Egypt over Jerusalem to appoint a Coptic Orthodox bishop of that church, which until then had been the prerogative of the Patriarch of Antioch. This angered Patriarch Ignatius III David, who retaliated by attempting unsuccessfully to fill the vacancy of Abuna or metropolitan for the Ethiopian Orthodox Church. This was a very rare incident between the two churches, as in general their relationship is one of the strongest between any two churches.

== Simony ==
Although he started his papacy by abiding to the Coptic Church's laws forbidding simony, he soon started selling ranks in the church. The Coptic Church's Bishops gathered in a synod in an attempt to prevent this. They decided to hold a general council of the clergy and the archons to look into the situation and make recommendations. Sultan al-Malik al-Sālih Najm al-Dīn Ayyūb (1239–1249) took the initiative and summoned that council. It is thought that Cyril II bribed the caliphal court with 12,000 dinars and due to this he was able to swing the verdict, continuing the practice of simony

== Death ==
Despite opposition to Cyril he was able to rule the church in relative peace until his death in 1243. His reign lasted seven years, nine months, and ten days, and he was buried in Wax Monastery (Dair El-Shamaa) at Giza, Egypt. After his death his Throne of Saint Mark remained vacant for seven years.

== St Francis of Assisi in Egypt in September 1219 ==
In 1219, accompanied by another friar, St Francis of Assisi went to Egypt during the Fifth Crusade (1213–1221 AD) hoping to convert the Sultan of Egypt, Al-Kamil (reign 1218–†1238 AD), believing that if this should happen, it would be sufficient to put an end to the conflict of the Crusades, or win martyrdom in his attempt. Earlier, St Francis tried to go to Morocco once, but he became ill by the time he reached Spain on his way to Morocco. The other friars who accompanied him and continued on to Morocco to preach to the Muslims became martyrs there.

In the summer of 1219, a Crusader army had been encamped for over a year besieging the walled city of Damietta. At the start of the siege, the Sultan, al-Kamil, a nephew of Saladin (reign 1174–†1193), who had just succeeded his father Sultan Al-Adil I (reign 1200–†1218) as Sultan of Egypt, was encamped upstream of Damietta, unable to relieve it. A bloody and futile attack on the city was launched by the Crusaders on August 29, 1219, following which both sides agreed to a ceasefire which lasted four weeks. It was most probably during this interlude that St Francis and his companion Brother Pacifico crossed the enemy lines and were brought before the Sultan, remaining in his camp for a few days. The visit is reported in contemporary Crusader sources and in the earliest biographies of St Francis, but they give no information about what transpired during the encounter beyond noting that the Sultan received Francis graciously and that Francis preached to the Muslims without effect, returning unharmed to the Crusader camp. The Sultan, al-Kamil received him kindly. No contemporary Arab source mentions the visit. One detail, added by St Francis' companion and biographer, friar Bonaventure (1221–†1274) in the official life of Francis (written in 1259, forty years after the event), is that St Francis offered to challenge the Sultan's "priests" (i.e. Islamic "Ulema" or "Sheikhs") to trial-by-fire in order to prove the veracity of the Christian Gospel. Although Bonaventure asserts that the sultan refused to permit the challenge, subsequent biographies went further, claiming that a fire was actually kindled which Francis unhesitatingly entered without suffering burns.

According to some late sources, the Sultan gave Francis permission to visit the sacred places in the Holy Land and even to preach there. All that can safely be asserted is that Francis and his companion left the Crusader camp for Acre, where they spent 9–11 months. From Acre, they embarked for Italy in the latter half of 1220. The Franciscan Order has been present in the Holy Land almost uninterruptedly since 1217 when Brother Elias arrived at Acre. It received concessions in 1333 from the Mameluke Sultan of Egypt Al-Malik Al-Nasir Nasir ad-Din Muhammad (reign 1310–1341) with regard to certain Holy Places in Jerusalem and Bethlehem.

== Primary sources for Church history for the period of Patriarch Cyrill III (1235 - 1243 AD) ==
[1] "History of the Patriarchs", Manuscript No 91, at the Library of the Coptic Patriarchate.

[2] "History of the Patriarch" by Abba Youssaab Bishop of Fouh (13th Century), based on a manuscript at the Monastery of the Virgin Mary known as the Syrian Monastery, and a copy thereof in the Library of Girguis Philotheos Awad, a prominent Coptic Scholar of the 20th Century.

[3] "The Letters of Cyril ibn Laqlaq", Manuscript No 291 Theology, at the Library of the Coptic Patriarchate.

[4] "Kitab Al-Tawareekh" by "Abi-Shaker ibn Al-Raheb", Manuscript Copy in the Library of Girguis Philotheos Awad, a prominent Coptic Scholar of the 20th Century.

[5] "History of Myron (Chrismation Oil)", Manuscript No 101 Rites, at the Library of the Coptic Patriarchate.

[6] "History of the Patriarchs", Manuscript No 15 History, at the Library of the Coptic Patriarchate.

[7] "Canons of the Fathers", Manuscript No 5 History, at the Library of the Coptic Patriarchate.

[8] "Canons of the Fathers", Manuscript dated to 1072 A. M. (1356 AD), Manuscript Copy in the Library of Girguis Philotheos Awad, a prominent Coptic Scholar of the 20th Century.

[9] "Al-Magmooa Al-Safwy l-ibn Al-Assaal", printed by Girguis Philotheos Awad, a prominent Coptic Scholar of the 20th Century, printed at AL-Tawfeek Press, based on a manuscript in his possession.

== Secondary Sources for Church History for the Period of Patriarch Cyrill III (1235 - 1243 AD) ==
[1] M. Chien, "Calendar and History of Christian Times in Egypt and Ethiopia", Paris (French Language Book).

[2] Marcos Semieka Pasha, "List of Books Located at Library of the Coptic Patriarchate".

[3] Marcos Semieka Pasha, "List of Books Located at Coptic Museum"

[4] Society of St Mina at Alexandria, "Images from the History of the Copts".

[5] Fr. Louis Sikho, "The Arabic Manuscripts of the Christian Authors".

Preceded by John VI	Coptic Pope; 1235–1243	Succeeded by Athanasius III
