= Al-Ashraf Musa, Sultan of Egypt =

Ayyubid sultan of Egypt from 1250 to 1254

Al Ashraf Musa الأشرف موسى
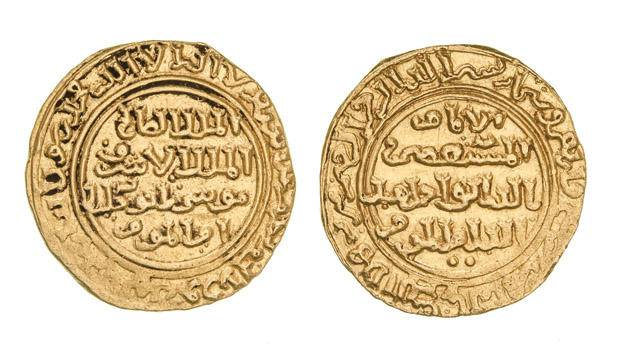
- A gold dirham minted during the reign of Al-Ashraf Musa 649 AH

Sultan of Egypt
- Reign: 1250–1254
- Predecessor: Izz ad-Din Aybak
- Successor: Izz ad-Din Aybak
- Regent: Izz ad-Din Aybak (1250–1254)
- Died: after 1254
Names
- Al-Ashraf Musa
- Dynasty: Ayyubid
- Father: An-Nasir Yusuf or Yusuf ibn Al-Mas'ud Yusuf
- Religion: Sunni Islam

Al-Ashraf Muzaffar ad-Din Musa (Arabic: الأشرف مظفر الدين موسى) was the last, albeit titular, Ayyubid Sultan of Egypt as the puppet of Izz ad-Din Aybak.

== Origins ==
The family origins of Al-Ashraf Musa are not entirely clear. According to Lane-Poole, Al-Ashraf Musa was a descendant of Saladin and the great grandson of Az-Zahir Ghazi, Amir of Aleppo, who had struggled against Al-Adil for supremacy in the Ayyubid domains. His grandfather, the son of Az-Zahir, was al-Aziz Mohammad, also Amir of Aleppo, while his father, son of al-Aziz, was An-Nasir Yusuf, Amir of Aleppo, and later Damascus. However, if this were the case he would have been titular head of a government in Egypt which was fighting his own father. According to other sources he was the son of Yusuf, and grandson of al-Mas'ud Yusuf. Al-Mas'ud Yusuf, the son of Sultan Al-Kamil of Egypt, was the last Ayyubid ruler of Yemen. After the Ayyubids were expelled from Yemen his family moved to Cairo.

== Accession ==
Ayyubid rule in Egypt had effectively come to an end in 1250 when the Mamluks murdered Al-Muazzam Turanshah. For a brief period Shajar ad-Durr ruled as Sultana, but she was soon replaced by Izz ad-Din Aybak. The murder of Turanshah meant that while the Mamluks controlled Egypt, the Ayyubid family remained in control of the Emirates in Palestine and Syria. Mamluk rule in Egypt was not secure, and following the death of Turanshah, the Ayyubid An-Nasir Yusuf, ruler of Aleppo, was welcomed into Damascus and began preparations to send an army into Egypt to make himself Sultan. The Mamluks understood that if he reached Cairo he would find enough of a welcome to seriously threaten their power. For this reason, they decided it would be prudent to have a nominal Ayyubid Sultan in power in Cairo, to give their rule a veneer of legitimacy. For this reason Aybak stood down after less than a week as Sultan, and the six-year-old Al-Ashraf Musa, was proclaimed Sultan in his place.

== Deposition ==
An-Nasir Yusuf's assaults on Egypt were repelled, and in 1253 an agreement was reached whereby he withdrew, leaving Egypt in Mamluk control. In 1254, a new potential threat to Aybak's rule emerged when Faris ad-Din Aktai, leader of the Bahri Mamluks, asked permission to move into the citadel of Cairo with his future wife, who was the sister of the Ayyubid ruler al-Malik al-Mansour of Hama. Sensing that Aktai would use this marriage to give himself legitimacy as Sultan, Aybak had him murdered. After this, Aybak resolved to rule on his own authority and decided he had no further need of a titular Ayyubid Sultan on whose behalf he claimed to act. Thereafter he deposed al-Ashraf Musa and sent him back to live with his aunt, proclaiming himself Sultan a second time.

== See also ==
- Other Al-Ashraf Musas

Al-Ashraf Musa, Sultan of Egypt Ayyubid dynasty
Regnal titles
Preceded by Izz ad-Din Aybak	Sultan of Egypt; 1250–1254 with Izz ad-Din Aybak	Succeeded by Izz ad-Din Aybak
