= Battle of Fariskur (1250) =

Ayyubid victory ending the Seventh Crusade

- Part of the Seventh Crusade
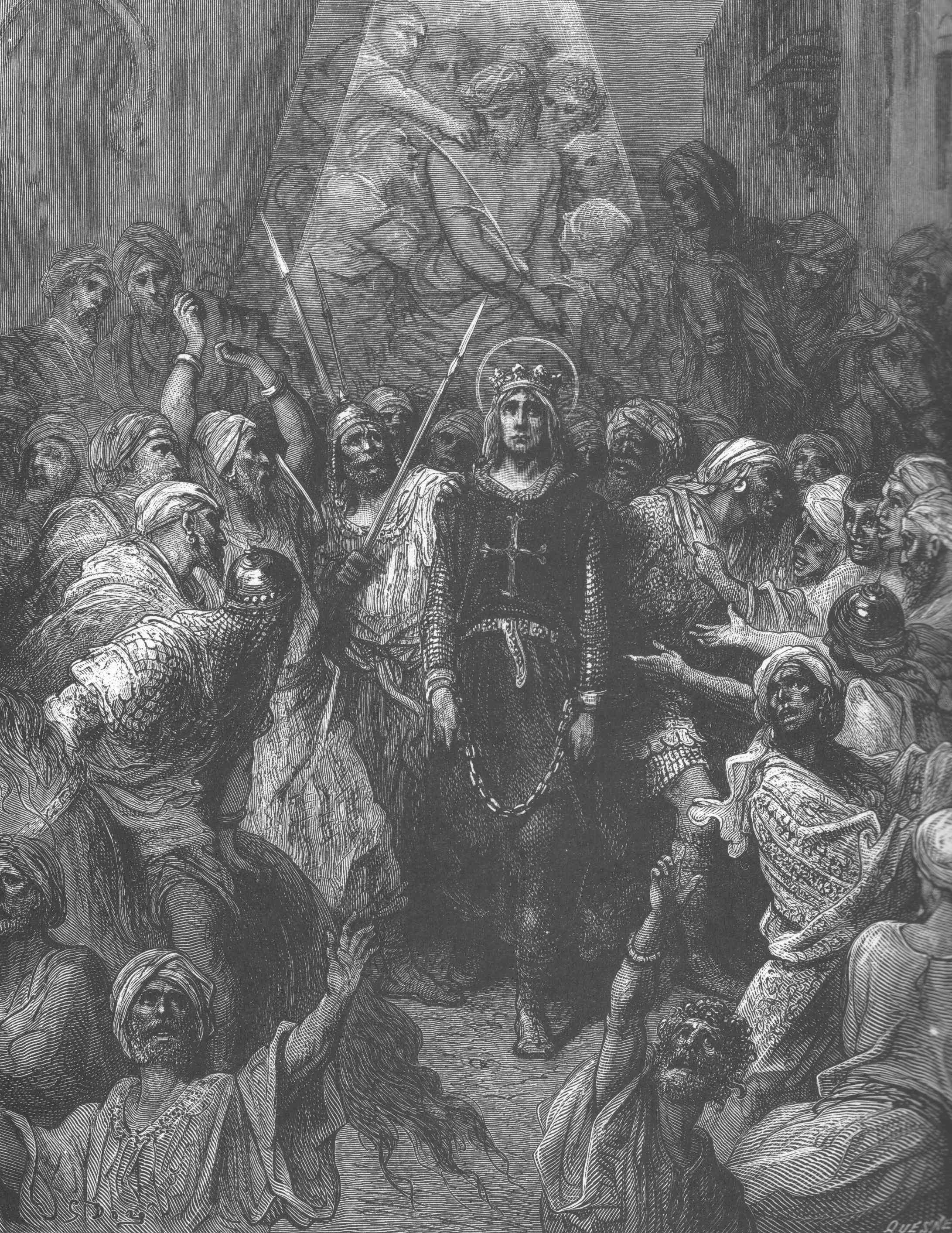
- Capture of King Louis
Date	6 April 1250
Location	Faraskur, Ayyubid Egypt 31°19′47″N 31°42′53″E
Result	Ayyubid victory

Belligerents
Ayyubid Sultanate: Egyptian Fellahin	Kingdom of France: Knights Templar; Knights Hospitaller

Commanders and leaders
Turanshah; Baybars	Louis IX of France (surrendered); Guillaume de Sonnac †; Jean de Joinville (surrendered)

Strength
Unknown Mamluks (heavily armed) Unknown infantry (including Sudanese and Arab auxiliaries)	~2,200-2,800 heavily armed knights Unknown infantry, archers and men-at-arms

Casualties and losses
Unknown	Thousands killed Many, or most taken captive

The Battle of Fariskur was the last major battle of the Seventh Crusade. The battle was fought on 6 April 1250, between the Crusaders led by King Louis IX of France (later Saint Louis) and Egyptian forces led by Turanshah of the Ayyubid dynasty.

Following the Crusaders' defeat at the Battle of Al Mansurah in February 1250, the Battle of Fariskur resulted in the complete defeat of the Crusader army and the capture of Louis IX.

== Background ==
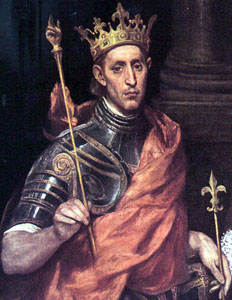
Louis IX

With the full support of Pope Innocent IV during the First Council of Lyon, King Louis IX of France accompanied by his brothers Charles I of Anjou and Robert I of Artois launched the Seventh Crusade against Egypt. The aims of the crusade were to defeat Egypt, destroy the Ayyubid dynasty in Egypt and Syria and recover Jerusalem which the Muslims had recaptured in 1244.

The ships entered the Egyptian waters and the troops of the Seventh Crusade disembarked at Damietta in June 1249. Louis IX sent a letter to as-Salih Ayyub, the Ayyubid Sultan of Egypt. Emir Fakhr ad-Din Yussuf, the commander of the Ayyubid garrison in Damietta retreated to the camp of the Sultan in Ashmum-Tanah causing a great panic among the inhabitants of Damietta who fled the town leaving the bridge that connected the west bank of the Nile with Damietta intact.

After occupying the Egyptian port of Damietta in June 1249, Louis decided to march to Cairo, encouraged by the arrival of reinforcements led by his third brother Alphonse of Poitiers and the news of the death of as-Salih Ayyub. The Franks succeeded in crossing the Canal of Ashmum (known today by the name al-Bahr al-Saghir) and launched a surprise attack against the Egyptian camp in Gideila, 3 km (2 mi) away from Al Mansurah. The Egyptian troops in the camp, who were taken by surprise, retreated to Al Mansurah and the crusaders proceeded towards the town. The leadership of the Egyptian force passed to the Mamluk commandants Faris ad-Din Aktai, Baibars al-Bunduqdari and Qutuz, who succeeded in reorganizing the retreating troops. Shajar al-Durr who was in full charge of Egypt agreed about the plan of Baibars to defend Al Mansurah. Baibars ordered the opening of a gate to let the knights of the crusaders enter the town. The crusaders rushed into the town that they thought was deserted to find themselves trapped inside. The crusaders were besieged from all directions by the Egyptian forces and the town's population and heavy losses were inflicted upon them. Robert de Artois (brother of Louis IX) who took refuge in a house and William of Salisbury were among those who were killed in Al Mansurah. Only five Knights Templar survived the battle. The crusaders were forced to retreat in disorder to Gideila where they camped within a ditch and wall. Early in the morning of February 11, the Muslim forces launched an offensive against the Franks' camp. For many weeks the Franks were forced to remain in their camp enduring an exhausting guerilla war. Many crusaders were captured and taken to Cairo.

== Battle ==
On 27 February Turanshah, the new sultan, arrived in Egypt from Hasankeyf and went straight to Al Mansurah to lead the Egyptian army. Ships were transported overland and dropped in the Nile (in Bahr al-Mahala) behind the ships of the crusaders, cutting the reinforcement line from Damietta and besieging the crusader force of King Louis IX. The Egyptians used Greek fire and destroyed and seized many ships and supply vessels. Soon the besieged crusaders were suffering from devastating attacks, famine and disease. Some crusaders lost faith and deserted to the Muslim side.

King Louis IX proposed to the Egyptians the surrender of Damietta in exchange for Jerusalem and some towns on the Syrian coast. The Egyptians, aware of the miserable situation of the crusaders, refused the besieged king's offer. On 5 April, covered by the darkness of night, the crusaders evacuated their camp and began to flee northward towards Damietta. In their panic and haste they neglected to destroy a pontoon bridge they had set over the canal. The Egyptians crossed the canal over the bridge and followed them to Fariskur where the Egyptians utterly destroyed the crusaders on 9 April. Thousands of crusaders were killed or taken prisoner. King Louis IX and a few of his nobles who survived were captured in the nearby village of Moniat Abdallah (now Meniat el Nasr) where they took refuge. Louis IX surrendered to a eunuch named al-Salihi after he was promised he would not be killed and together with his two brothers Charles d'Anjou and Alphonse de Poitiers he was taken to Al Mansurah where he was imprisoned in the house of Ibrahim ben Lokman, the royal chancellor, chained and under the guard of another eunuch named Sobih al-Moazami. King Louis' coif was exhibited in Syria. While the house of Ibrahim ben Lokman was used as a prison for Louis IX and the nobles, a camp was set up outside Al Mansurah to shelter thousands of war prisoners.

== Aftermath ==
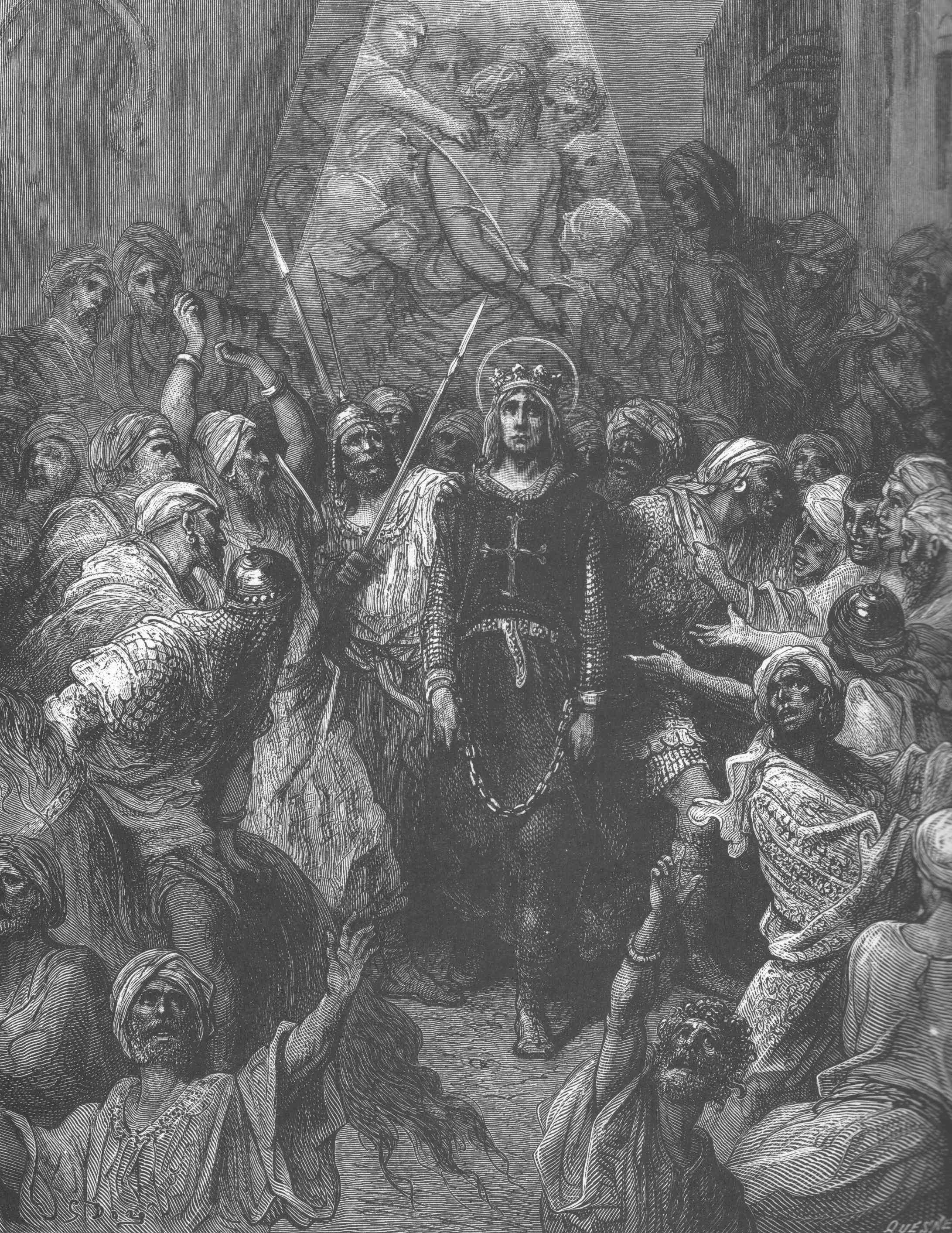
Louis IX was taken prisoner and ransomed.

The defeat of the crusaders and the capture of King Louis IX in Fariskur created shock in France. The crusaders were circulating false information in Europe, claiming that Louis IX had defeated the Sultan of Egypt in a great battle and that Cairo had been betrayed into his hands. When the news of the French defeat reached France, a hysterical movement called the Shepherds' Crusade occurred in France.

Louis IX was ransomed for 400,000 dinars. After he pledged not to return to Egypt again and surrendered Damietta to the Egyptians, he was allowed to leave on 8 May 1250, to Acre with his brothers and 12,000 fellow prisoners, including some from older battles, whom the Egyptians agreed to release. Many other prisoners were executed. Louis's wife, Margaret of Provence, suffered from nightmares. The news (the capture of her husband Louis) terrified her so much, that every time she fell asleep, she fancied that her room was filled with bearded Muslims, and she would cry out, "Help! help!" and left for Acre a few days earlier with her son, born in Damietta, who was called John Tristan.

The National Day of Damietta Governorate, on 8 May marks the anniversary of the expulsion of Louis IX from Egypt in 1250.

== Historical consequence ==
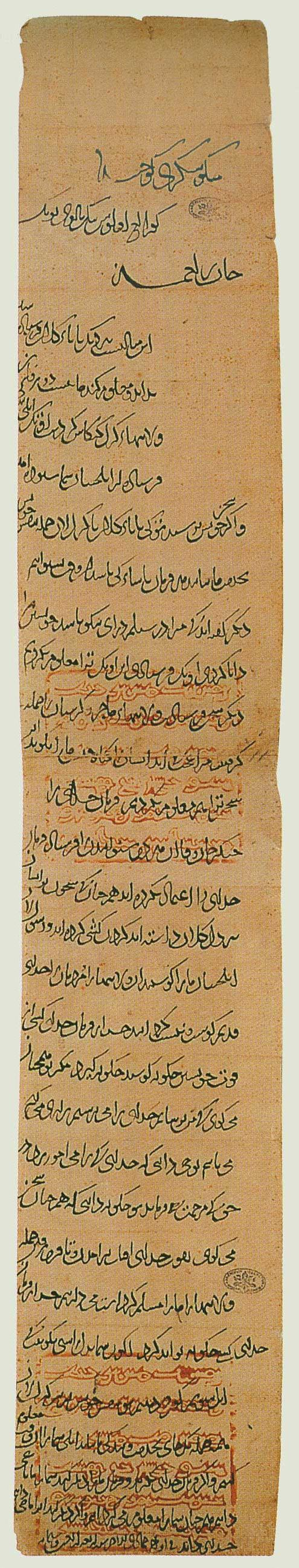
The 1246 letter of Güyük to Pope Innocent IV

The Seventh Crusade met its end at Fariskur in 1250, marking a historical turning point for all the regional parties existing at that time. Egypt defeated Louis's crusade and proved to be Islam's citadel and arsenal. The Seventh Crusade was the last major offensive undertaken by the Crusaders against Egypt. The Crusaders never again recovered Jerusalem and the kings of Europe, except Louis IX, began to lose their interest in launching new crusades. But shortly after the battle of Fariskur, the Ayyubid Sultan Turanshah was assassinated at Fariskur itself and the Mamluks, the same victorious champions of Al Mansurah, became the new rulers of Egypt. The power map of the southern and eastern Mediterranean basin became divided among four main dominions: Mamluk Egypt, Ayyubid Syria, the Franks of Acre and Syrian Christian beach-heads and the Levantine Christian state of Cilician Armenia. While the Mamluks of Egypt and the Ayyubids of Syria turned into conflicting rivals, the Franks and the Cilician Armenians in addition to the Principality of Antioch were allied. The Mongols, who suddenly erupted out of the Eurasian Steppe, had their armies by 1241 riding westwards as far as the river Oder and the northeastern shore of the Adriatic and during the Battle of Fariskur they were penetrating deep into all adjoining regions.

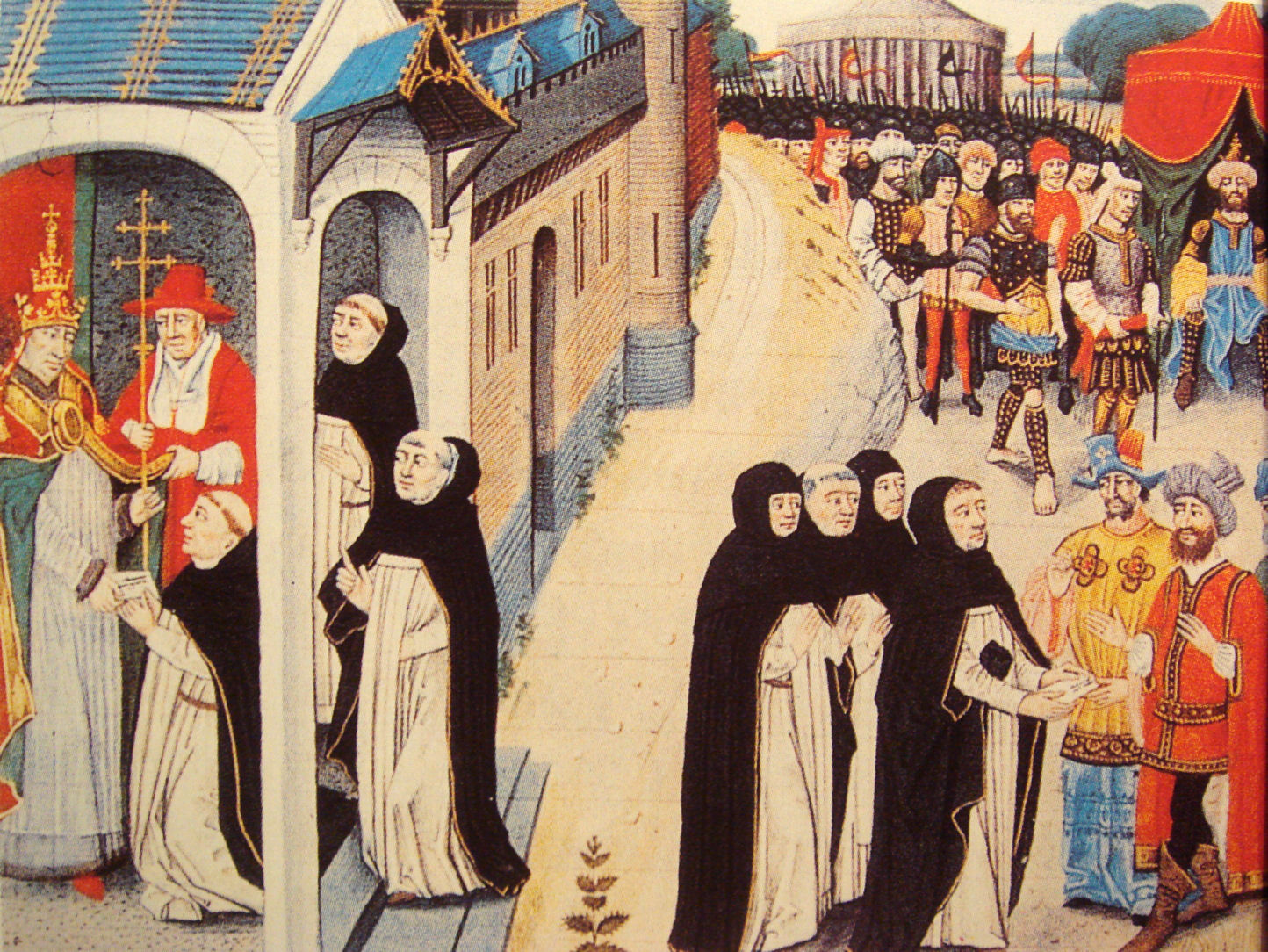
The pope sent emissaries to the Mongols. Ascelin of Lombardia receiving (left) and remitting (right) a letter to the Mongol general Baiju.

The Western Christians and the Cilician Armenians always hoped to have a grand alliance with the Mongols against the Islamic World. The Cilician Armenians submitted themselves to Mongol suzerainty in 1247, and in 1254 their King Hetoum visited the Mongols' capital. In 1246, Pope Innocent IV, who fully supported the Seventh Crusade against Egypt, sent his Franciscan emissary Giovanni da Pian del Carpine to the Great Khan of the Mongols in Qaraqorum to seek an alliance against the Muslims. However, he received a disappointing answer from Güyük Khan who told him that he and the kings of Europe should submit to the Mongols. In 1253, after his defeat in Egypt, King Louis IX sent from Acre another emissary, the Franciscan friar William of Rubruck who accompanied him earlier in his Egyptian expedition, but the outcome of this trip was also not followed by effective action.

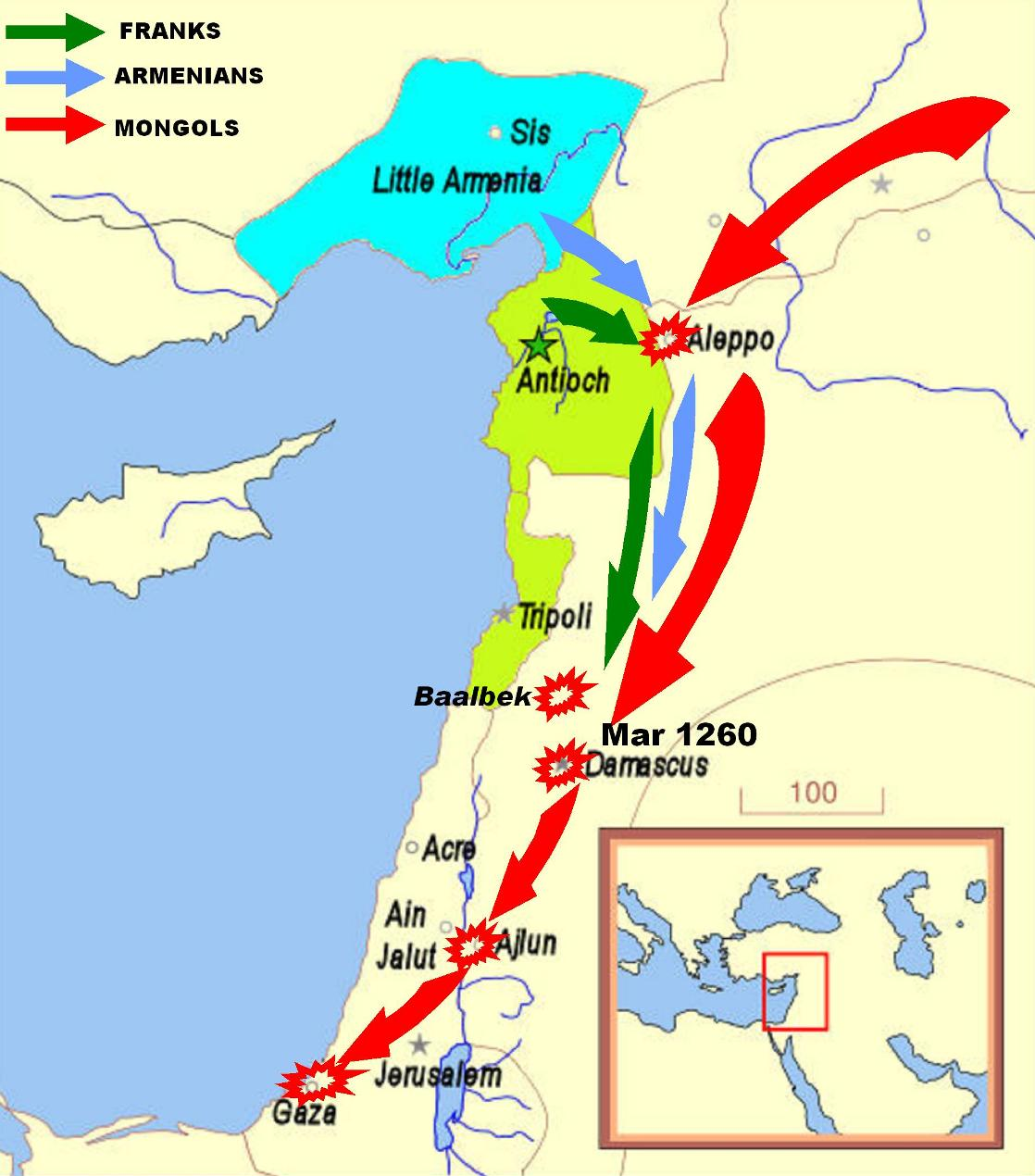
The 1260 Mongol offensive reached the border of Egypt.

In 1258 a Mongol army of perhaps 50,000 soldiers led by Hulagu Khan sacked Baghdad and liquidated the Abbasid Caliphate, then advanced to Syria and captured Damascus. The path to Egypt was then open. The Mongols sent a threatening message to Egypt asking it to submit to the Mongols. However, Hulagu withdrew with the bulk of his forces west of Bagdad, leaving only a garrison of 10,000 (a single tumen) with his lieutenant, Kitbuga. In 1260 an Egyptian army led by the Mamluk Sultan Qutuz and commander Baibars al-Bunduqdari – the same champions of Al Mansurah – annihilated this Mongol force at Ain Jalut. The commander of the Mongol army who was killed at the battle was Kitbuqa, a Nestorian Christian who was accompanied by the Christian king of Cilician Armenia and by the Christian prince of Antioch. The Franks of Acre who stood neutral, and who were warned by Qutuz not to commit an act of treachery, gave passage to the Egyptian army. The triumphant army took Damascus and Syria became part of the Mamluks' dominion.

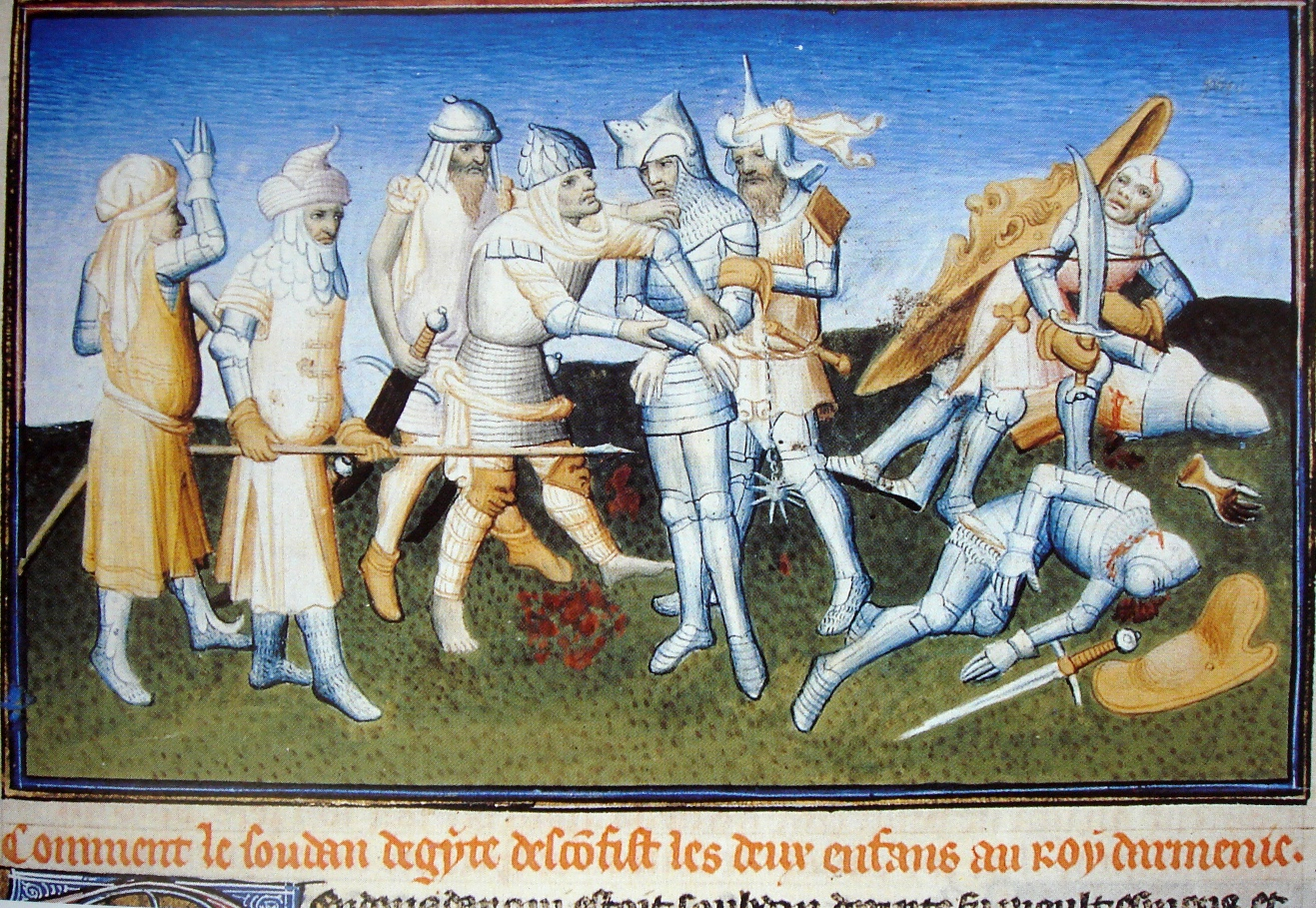
Baybars punished the Armenian Kingdom of Cilicia in 1266.

Later, during the era of Sultan al-Zahir Baibars al-Bunduqdari, the Cilician Armenians and the Principality of Antioch had to pay a huge price for their alliance with the Mongols. After the Battle of Ain Jalut the Mamluks repulsed three more invasions of Syria by the Mongols. Due to the efforts of the Mamluk Sultanate of Egypt under Baybars, Islam survived the combined Crusaders and Mongol invasions though it had never been in such great jeopardy at any date since its birth.

In 1260, the Mongol Empire suffered a serious split when Mongols of the Golden Horde, in the western half of the Eurasian steppe, converted to Islam and allied with the Mamluks (see Berke–Hulagu war), followed, in later years by other Mongols. In 1270 Louis IX made his last attempt and organized a new crusade (the Eighth Crusade) against Tunis, hoping to be able to attack Egypt again from there, but he died in Tunis. During the reign of Sultan Baibars the number of the Franks' dominions on the Syrian coast were reduced drastically. Acre and the last Frankish strongholds were captured by the Mamluk Sultan al-Ashraf Khalil between 1291 and 1292.

== See also ==
- Battle of Al Mansurah
- Berke–Hulagu war
