= Aybak =

Mamluk sultan of Egypt (1250, 1254–1257)

Izz al-Din Aybak
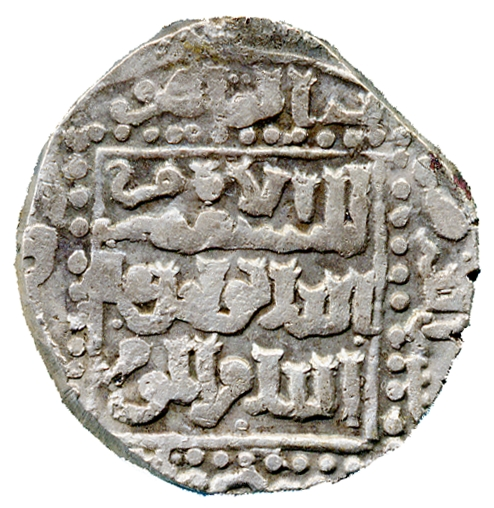
- Silver dirham of Aybak minted in Cairo in 1256

Sultan of Egypt
- First reign: July 1250 (five days)
- Predecessor: Shajar al-Durr
- Successor: Al-Ashraf Musa
- Second reign: 1254–1257
- Predecessor: Al-Ashraf Musa
- Successor: Al-Mansur Ali
- Born: 1205
- Died: 1257 (aged 51–52); Cairo Egypt
- Burial: Cairo
- Spouse: Shajar al-Durr
- Issue: Al-Mansur Ali
Names
- al-Malik al-Mu'izz Izz al-Din Aybak al-Jawshangir al-Turkmani al-Salihi
Era name and dates
- Bahri Mamluks: 1250, 1254–1382, 1389
- Religion: Sunni Islam

Izz al-Din Aybak (Note: The name Aybeg or Aibak or Aybak is a combination of two Turkic words, "Ay" = Moon and "Beg" or variant "Bak" = Emir in Arabic. -(Al-Maqrizi, Note p.463/vol.1 )) (Arabic: عز الدين أيبك) (epithet: al-Malik al-Muʕizz ʕizz ad-Dīn ʔaybak (al-Jāšankīr) at-Turkumāniyy aṣ-Ṣāliḥiyy, Arabic: الملك المعز عز الدين أيبك (الجاشنكير) التركماني الصالحي) was the first of the Mamluk sultans of Egypt in the Turkic Bahri line. (Note: Though Aybak is regarded by historian as a Mamluk, he actually served in the court of as-Salih Ayyub as an Emir/military commander and not as a Mamluk.- Shayal, p. 153/ vol.2- Al-Maqrizi, p. 463/vol.1 – According to Ibn Taghri as-Salih Ayyub bought him before he became a Sultan and he promoted him to the position an Emir. The rank which Aybak used was of a Khawanja (خوانجا Sultan's accountant ). Ibn Taghri, PP.103-273/ The Sultanate of al-Muizz Aybak al-Turkumani.) (Note: Some historians, however, consider Shajar Adurr as the first of the Mamluk Sultans. Shayal, p.115/vol.2.) (Note: Al-Maqrizi, also, described Shajar Adurr as the first of the Mamluk sultans of Turkic origin. al-Maqrizi, p.459/ vol.1) He ruled from 1250 until his death in 1257.

== Origin and early career ==
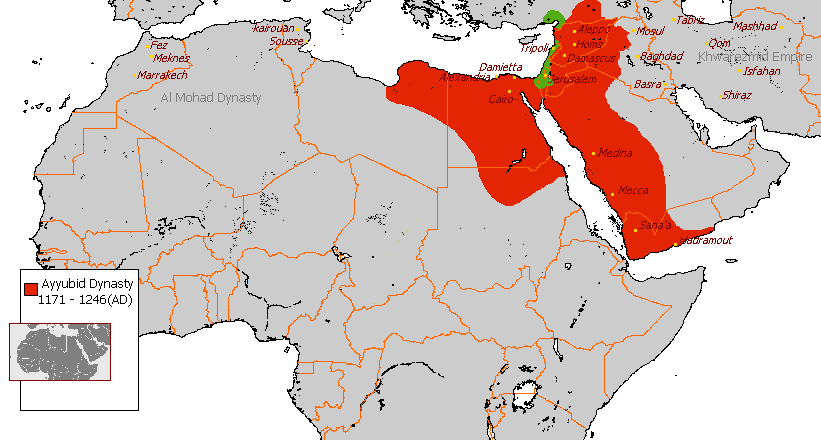
Ayyubid dominion before Mamluks took power in Egypt.

Aybak (Turkic: ay, moon; bak, commander) was an Emir/commander of Turkic origin who served with other Turkmens in the court of the Ayyubid sultan as-Salih Ayyub and therefore was known among the Bahri Mamluks as Aybak al-Turkmani. He raised to the position of Emir (commander) and worked as a Jashnkir (taster of the sultan's food and drink, or cupbearer) and used the rank of a Khawanja (Sultan's accountant). (Note: See note 1.)

After the death of as-Salih Ayyub during the Frankish invasion of Damietta in 1249 and the murder of his heir and son Turanshah in 1250, Shajar al-Durr, the widow of as-Salih Ayyub, with the help and support of the Mamluks of her late husband, seized the throne and became the Sultana of Egypt. The Ayyubids lost control over Egypt.

Both the Ayyubids in Syria and the Abbasid Caliph al-Musta'sim in Baghdad defied the Mamluk move in Egypt and refused to recognize Shajar al-Durr as a Sultana (Note: The Abbasid Caliph al-Musta'sim sent a message from Baghdad to the Mamluks in Egypt that said :"If you do not have men there tell us so we can send you men."- Al-Maqrizi, p.464/vol1) but the Mamluks in Egypt renewed their oath to the new Sultana, and she appointed Aybak to the important position of Atabeg (commander in chief).

== Rise to power (1250) ==
Feeling uneasy when the Syrian Emirs refused to pay homage to Shajar al-Durr and granted Damascus to an-Nasir Yusuf the Ayyubid emir of Aleppo, Shajar al-Durr married Aybak then abdicated and passed the throne to Aybak after she ruled Egypt for 80 days, starting on May 2, 1250.

Aybak, from the end of July 1250 the new sultan of Egypt, was given the royal name al-Malik al-Muizz. Until then, Aybak relied foremost on four Mamluks: Faris ad-Din Aktai, Baibars al-Bunduqdari, Qutuz and Bilban al-Rashidi.

Aybak's formal rule ended after just five days. To consolidate his position of Aybak, and attempting to satisfy their opponents in Syria and Baghdad, the Bahri Mamluks installed the 6-year-old al-Ashraf Musa, (Note: Also known as Al-Nasir Salah ad-Din Yusuf. – Al-Maqrizi, p.464/vol.1- Ibn Taghri, pp.103-273/ The Sultanate of al-Muizz Aybak al-Turkumani.) (Note: Coins of Musa show he was a Sultan and not a co-sultan.) who was one of the Syrian branch of the Ayyubid family (Note: al-Malik Sharaf Muzafer al-Din Musa was a grandson of al-Malik al-Kamil. Al-Maqrizi, p.464/vol.1 – Shayal, p.115/ vol.2 – Ibn Taghri, pp.103-273/ The Sultanate of al-Muizz Aybak al-Turkumani,) as a Sultan and announced that Aybak is merely a representative of the Abbasid Caliph in Baghdad. In addition, and to display his loyalty to his deceased Ayyubid master as-Salih Ayyub, Aybak organised a funeral ceremony for as-Salih and buried him in the tomb which as-Salih had built for himself before his death near his madrasah in the district of Bain al-Qasrain in Cairo. (Note: The death of as-Salih Ayyub was concealed by his wife Shajar ad-Durr as Egypt was under the attack of the Seventh Crusade and his coffined body was transported by a boat in secret to the castle of al-Rudah island in the Nile where it stayed till was buried by Aybak in the Sultan's tomb near as-Salih's Madrasah. ( Al-Maqrizi, pp. 441-443/vol.1 ) See also Shajar al-Durr.) Nevertheless, the actual power in Egypt was still exercised by Aybak, who had returned to his position of atabak (atabeg).

== Ayyubid challenge ==
An-Nasir Yusuf sent his forces to Gaza to conquer Egypt and overthrow Aybak but his forces were defeated by Emir Faris ad-Din Aktai in October 1250. Then he led a huge army and clashed with Aybak's army near Al-Salihiyya, not far from Cairo, but at the end of the battle he was forced to flee to Damascus while his son Turanshah, (Note: Not to be confused with his namesake Sultan Turanshah the son of as-Salih Ayyub.) his brother Nosrat ad-Din and al-Malik al-Ashraf the Emir of Aleppo were among the prisoners caught by Aybak's army. Aybak's triumphs over the Ayyobids of Syria consolidated his position as a ruler of Egypt. Through negotiation and mediation of the Abbasid Caliph, Aybak freed the Ayyubid prisoners and gained control over southern Palestine including Gaza and Jerusalem and the Syrian coast. Feeling secure by his victories and his agreement with the Ayyubids, Aybak imprisoned the young Ayyubid co-sultan Musa and appointed Qutuz as vice-sultan in 1252.

== Rebellion ==
In 1253, a serious rebellion led by Hisn al-Din Thalab in Upper and Middle Egypt was crushed by Aktai, the leader of the Bahri Mamluks. By defeating the Ayyubid forces of An-Nasir Yusuf and the crushing of the rebellion of Thalab the power of Emir Aktai and his Mamluks increased and they began to form a new threat to the authority of Aybak. When Aktai asked Aybak to allow him to live inside the citadel (Note: Citadel of the Mountain was the abode and court of the sultan in Cairo) with his future wife who was the sister of al-Malik al-Mansour, the Emir of Hama, Aybak became convinced that Aktai and his Mamluks had the intention to overthrow him and, thus, he decided to get rid of them.

== Crackdown on Mamluks (1254–55) ==
In 1254, in a conspiracy with Qutuz and a few Mamluks, Aybak invited Aktai to the citadel and had him murdered. Watching the head of Aktai thrown out from the citadel, the Bahriyya Mamluks, among them Baibars al-Bunduqdari and Qalawun al-Alfi, fled during the night to Damascus, al-Karak and the Seljuk Sultanate of Rûm. Aybak plundered the properties of the Bahriyya Mamluks and retracted Alexandria which Aktai controlled as own domain since 1252. Those who could not flee were either imprisoned or executed. As soon as he finished with Aktai and his Bahriyya Mamluks, Aybak dethroned the child co-sultan al-Ashraf Musa and sent him back to his aunts' house, which was his home before they had made him a co-sultan. Now Aybak was the absolute and sole ruler of Egypt and parts of Syria, but shortly afterwards he settled a new agreement with an-Nasir Yusuf, which limited his power to Egypt only.

In 1255 a new rebellion led by his namesake Izz al-Din Aybak al-Afram arose in upper Egypt and forces of an-Nasir Yusuf arrived to the Egyptian border, this time accompanied by the Bahriyya Mamluks who had fled to Syria, including Baibars al-Bunduqdari and Qalawun al-Alfi.

== End ==
Being in need to form an alliance with an ally who could help him against the threat of the Mamluks who had fled to Syria, Aybak decided in 1257 to marry the daughter of Badr ad-Din Lu'lu', the emir of Mosul. Shajar al-Durr, who already had disputes with Aybak (Note: Aybak's conflict with the Mamluks and his attempt to increase his supremacy over political matters had its effect on his relation with Shajar Al-Durr. According to Al-Maqrizi, Aybak decided to liquidate Shajar Al-Durr after he was warned that she contacted An-Nasir Yusuf and promised him to make him the Sultan of Egypt. Al-Maqrizi, pp.493-494/vol.1) felt betrayed by the man who she made sultan, and had him murdered after he had ruled Egypt seven years. On the day of his death he was about 60 years old and had a few sons, among them Nasir ad-Din Khan and al-Mansur Ali.

Aybak's 11-year-old son Ali was installed by his loyal Mamluks (Mu'iziyya Mamluks), who were led by Qutuz. The new sultan took the royal name al-Malik al-Mansur Nour ad-Din Ali with Qutuz as a vice-sultan.

== Impact ==
Aybak was not liked nor respected by the Egyptians though he was remembered by the historian as a courageous and generous Sultan. (Note: In Sirat al-Zahir Baibars, which is a fiction mixed with reality and a product of folklore, Aybak appears as a wicked and a feeble man. See Sirat al-Zahir Baibars.)

Aybak ruled in a turbulent time. In addition to his conflicts with an-Nasir Yusuf in Syria and Emir Aktai and his Mamluks in Egypt, there were threats from external forces, namely the Crusaders and Louis IX of France who were in Acre waiting for a chance to score a success against the Muslims after their humiliating defeat in Egypt in 1250, (Note: See Battle of Al Mansurah and Battle of Fariskur) and the Mongols led by Hulagu who were starting to raid the eastern borders of the Islamic world. (Note: In 1252 during Aybak reign Mongols raided towns and territories on the eastern border of the Islamic world. – Al-Maqrizi, p.477/vol.1)

Before their deaths, Aybak and Shajar al-Durr firmly established the Mamluk Sultanate that would ultimately repulse the Mongols, expel the European Crusaders from the Holy Land, and would remain the most powerful political force in the Middle East until the coming of the Ottomans.

Aibak built a Madrasah in Cairo known by the name al-Madrasah al-Mu'izzyah.

== See also ==
- An-Nasir Yusuf
- Bahri dynasty
- Kipchaks
- List of rulers of Egypt

== Footnotes ==
Aybak Mamluk Sultanate Born: ? Died: 1257
Regnal titles
Preceded by Shajar al-Durr	Sultan of Egypt; 1250	Succeeded by Al-Ashraf Musa
Preceded by Al-Ashraf Musa	Sultan of Egypt; 1254–1257	Succeeded by Al-Mansur Ali
