= Battle of Mansurah (1250) =

Part of the Seventh Crusade

Coordinates: 31.0456°N 31.3826°E

- Part of the Seventh Crusade
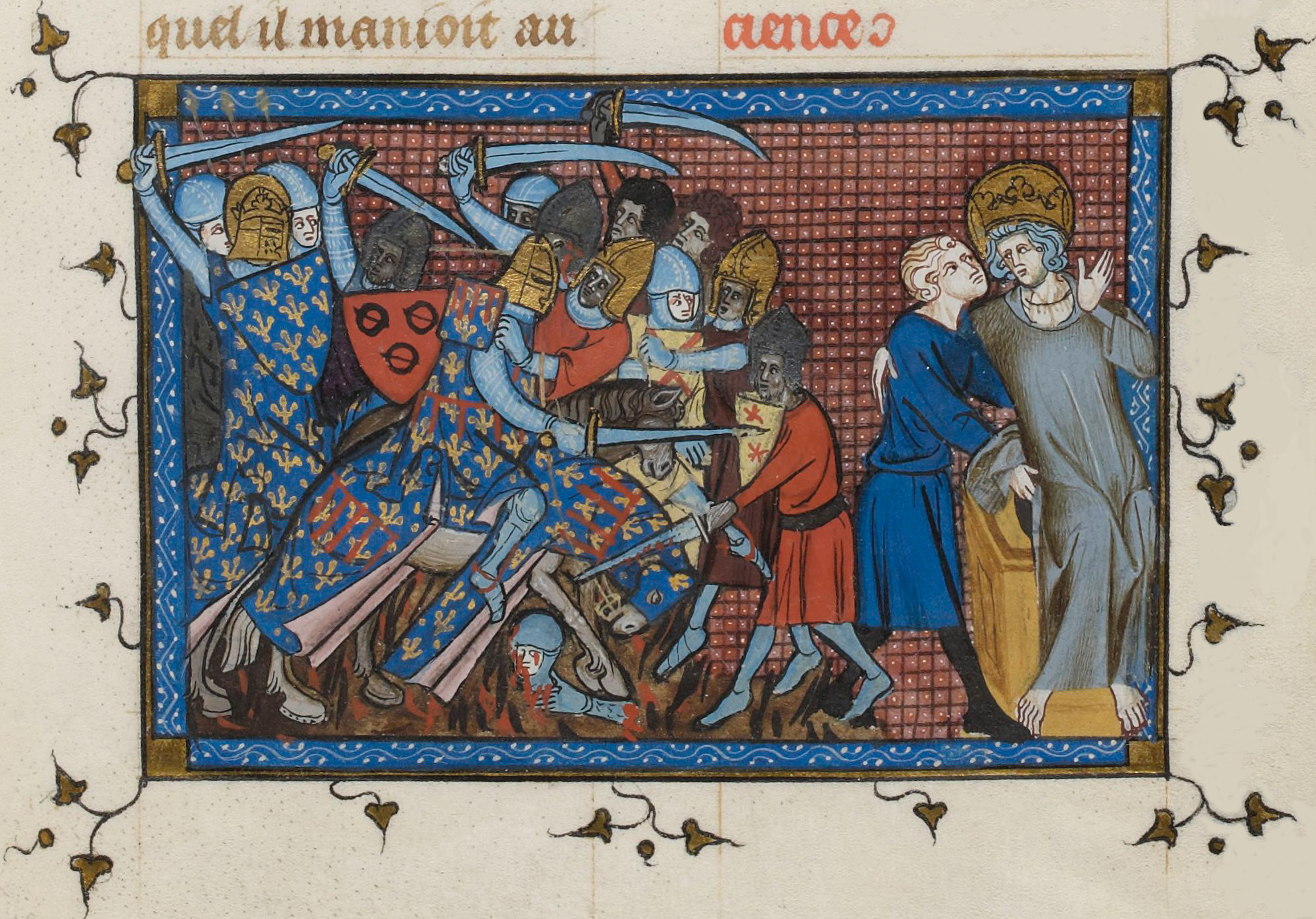
- Battle of Mansurah
Date	8–11 February 1250
Location	Mansurah, (Lower Egypt)
Result	Ayyubid victory

Belligerents
Ayyubid Sultanate of Egypt: Bahri Mamluks	Kingdom of France: Knights Templar; Order of St. Lazarus; Knights Hospitaller; Maronites

Commanders and leaders
Shajar al-Durr; Fakhr al-Din ibn al-Shaykh †; Qutuz; Baybars	Louis IX; Guillaume de Sonnac; Alphonse de Poitiers; Robert d'Artois †; William II Longespée †; Jean de Ronay †

Strength
4,600 cavalry: 800-1000 elite Bahri Mamluks; 6,000+ infantry: Sudanese and Arab auxiliaries	2,800+ knights: 280 knights of the Templar Order; 15,000 infantry: Crossbowmen and mounted sergeants

Casualties and losses
Heavy	300 knights, 80 Templars and a larger number of infantry

The Battle of Mansurah was fought from 8 to 11 February 1250, between crusaders led by King Louis IX of France and Ayyubid forces led by Vizier Fakhr al-Din ibn al-Shaykh, Qutuz and Baybars. It was fought in present-day Mansoura, Egypt. The Crusader force was enticed into entering the town where it was set upon by the Muslim force. The Crusaders withdrew in disorder to their encampment where they were besieged by the Egyptians. The Crusaders broke out and withdrew to Damietta in early April.

== Background ==
By the mid-13th century, the crusaders became convinced that Egypt, the heart of Islam's forces and arsenal, was an obstacle to their ambition to capture Jerusalem, which they had lost for the second time in 1244. In 1245, during the First Council of Lyon, Pope Innocent IV gave his full support to the Seventh Crusade being prepared by King Louis IX of France.

The goals of the Seventh Crusade were to destroy the Ayyubid dynasty in Egypt and Syria, and to recapture Jerusalem. The crusaders asked the Mongols to become their allies against the Muslims, the crusaders attacking the Muslim world from west, and the Mongols attacking from the east. Güyük, the great khan of the Mongols, told the pope's envoy that the Pope and the kings of Europe should submit to the Mongols.

The ships of the Seventh Crusade, led by King Louis's brothers, Charles I of Anjou and Robert I of Artois, sailed from Aigues-Mortes and Marseille to Cyprus during the autumn of 1248, and then on to Egypt. The ships entered Egyptian waters and the troops of the Seventh Crusade disembarked at Damietta in June 1249. Louis IX sent a letter to as-Salih Ayyub. Emir Fakhr ad-Din Yusuf, the commander of the Ayyubid garrison in Damietta, retreated to the camp of the sultan in Ashmum-Tanah, causing a great panic among the inhabitants of Damietta, who fled the town, leaving the bridge that connected the west bank of the Nile with Damietta intact. The crusaders crossed over the bridge and occupied Damietta, which was deserted. The fall of Damietta caused a general emergency (called al-Nafir al-Am النفير العام) to be declared, and locals from Cairo and from all over Egypt moved to the battle zone. For many weeks, the Muslims used guerrilla tactics against the crusader camps; many of the crusaders were captured and sent to Cairo. As the crusader army was strengthened by the arrival of Alphonse of Poitiers, the third brother of King Louis IX, at Damietta, the crusaders were encouraged by the news of the death of the Ayyubid Sultan, as-Salih Ayyub. The crusaders began their march towards Cairo. Shajar al-Durr, the widow of the dead sultan, concealed the news for some time and sent Faris ad-Din Aktai to Hasankeyf to recall Turanshah, the son and heir, to ascend the throne and lead the Egyptian army.

== Battle ==
The Crusaders approached the battle by the canal of Ashmum (known today by the name Albahr Alsaghir), which separated them from the Muslim camp. An Egyptian showed the Crusaders the way to the canal shoals. The Crusaders, led by Robert of Artois, crossed the canal with the Knights Templar and an English contingent led by William of Salisbury, launching a surprise assault on the Egyptian camp in Gideila, two miles (3 km) from al-Mansurah, and advancing toward the royal palace in al-Mansurah. The leadership of the Egyptian forces passed to the Mamluks. Sayf ad-Din Qutuz, and Baibars al-Buduqdari who contained the attack and reorganized the Muslim forces. This was the first appearance of the Mamluks as supreme commanders inside Egypt. Shajar al-Durr, who had full control of Egypt, agreed with Baibars' plan to defend al-Mansurah. Baibars ordered the gate be opened to let the Crusaders enter the town. The crusaders rushed in, thinking the town deserted, only to find themselves trapped inside. The Crusaders were besieged from all directions by Egyptian forces and the local population, and they took heavy losses. Robert of Artois, who took refuge in a house, and William of Salisbury were both killed along with most of the Knights Templar. Only five Templar Knights escaped alive. The Crusaders retreated to their camp in disorder, and surrounded it with a ditch and wall.

== Aftermath ==
King Louis IX tried to negotiate with the Egyptians, offering the surrender of the Egyptian port of Damietta in exchange for Jerusalem and a few towns on the Syrian coast. The Egyptians rejected the offer, and the Crusaders, struck by disease, retreated to Damietta on April 5, followed closely by the Muslim forces. At the subsequent Battle of Fariskur, the last major battle of the Seventh Crusade, the Crusader forces were annihilated and King Louis IX was captured on April 6. Meanwhile, the Crusaders were circulating false information in Europe, claiming that King Louis IX defeated the Sultan of Egypt in a great battle, and Cairo had been betrayed into Louis's hands. Later, when the news of Louis IX's capture and the French defeat reached France, the Shepherds' Crusade movement occurred in France.

== See also ==
- Battle of Mansurah (1221)
- Berke–Hulagu war
