= El Salheya =

El Salheya الصالحية
- Location in Egypt
- Coordinates: 30.746557°N 32.00449°E
- Country: Egypt
- Governorate: Sharqia
- Time zone: UTC+2 (EET)
  - Summer (DST): UTC+3 (EEST)

El Salheya (Egyptian Arabic: الصالحية) is a city in the Sharqia Governorate, Egypt.

== History ==
On his way back to Cairo after the Battle of Ain Jalut, Sultan of Egypt Qutuz was assassinated in El Salheya. The region also witnessed the Battle of Salahieh on 11 August 1798 during the French campaign in Egypt and Syria.
