= An-Nasir Yusuf =

Ayyubid emir of Damascus (1250–1260) and Aleppo (1236–1260)

Salah ad-Din Yusuf
- Al-Malik an-Nasir

Emir of Damascus
- Reign: 1250 – 1260
- Predecessor: Al-Muazzam Turanshah
- Successor: Emirate abolished

Emir of Aleppo
- Reign: 26 November 1236 – 1260
- Predecessor: Al-Aziz Muhammad
- Successor: Emirate abolished
- Regent: Dayfa Khatun (1236–1242)
- Born: 1228
- Died: 1260 (aged 31–32)
- Issue: Al-Aziz
- Dynasty: Ayyubid
- Father: Al-Aziz Muhammad
- Religion: Sunni Islam

An-Nasir Yusuf (Arabic: الناصر يوسف; AD 1228–1260), fully al-Malik al-Nasir Salah al-Din Yusuf ibn al-Aziz ibn al-Zahir ibn Salah al-Din Yusuf ibn Ayyub ibn Shazy (الملك الناصر صلاح الدين يوسف بن الظاهر بن العزيز بن صلاح الدين يوسف بن أيوب بن شاذى), was the Ayyubid Kurdish Emir of Syria from his seat in Aleppo (1236–1260), and the Sultan of the Ayyubid Empire from 1250 until the sack of Aleppo by the Mongols in 1260.

== Background ==
An-Nasir Yusuf was the great-grandson of Saladin. He became the Ayyubid ruler of Aleppo when he was seven-years-old after the death of his father Al-Aziz Muhammad. He was placed under a four-man regency council, consisting of the vizier Ibn al-Qifti, the emir Shams al-Din Lu'lu' al-Amini, the emir 'Izz al-Din 'Umar ibn Mujalli and Jamal al-Dawla Iqbal. The last was the representative of an-Nasir's grandmother, Dayfa Khatun, daughter of Al-Adil I, who was the effective ruler until her death in 1242. Thereafter until his death in 1251, Shams al-Din was an-Nasir's commander-in-chief and most influential advisor. His most loyal troops were the Qaymariyya, upon whose emirs he relied heavily for advice.

== Conflict with Egyptian Mamluks ==
In 1250, when the Ayyubid sultan of Egypt as-Salih Ayyub died and his son Turanshah was murdered by the Bahri Mamluks of Egypt, Shajar al-Durr (widow of as-Salih Ayyub ) seized the throne of Egypt. An-Nasir Yusuf, being an Ayyubid, refused to recognize Shajar al-Durr as the Sultana of Egypt and, as a sign of support, the Emirs of Syria granted him the city of Damascus, in Syria.

Alarmed by these developments, the Mamluk leaders in Egypt decided to replace Shajar al Durr with the Atabek (commander in chief) Aybak. In October 1250, An-Nasir Yusuf sent forces to Gaza to conquer Egypt and overthrow Aybak, but Egyptian forces led by Faris ad-Din Aktai defeated them.

In January 1251, an-Nasir Yusuf led another army to Egypt and clashed with Aybak's army, whose vanguard was led by Qutuz, in a significant battle that led to Yusuf's defeat. He fled back to Damascus, though some of his soldiers who could reach Cairo spread the initial impression inside Egypt that Yusuf had won the battle. Later when the news of Aybak's ultimate victory arrived, the soldiers and their commanders were arrested, and Aybak sent back the soldiers, some 3,000 in number, to Damascus on the backs of donkeys.

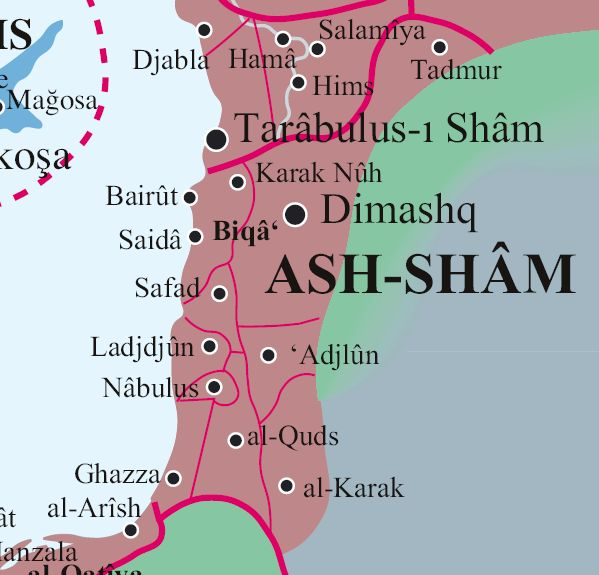
al-Sham coastline.

In 1253, through mediation of some Emirs, an accord was reached between an-Nasir Yusuf and Aybak which gave the Egyptians control over Gaza, Jerusalem, Nablus, and the coastline of al-Sham.

In 1254, another power shift occurred in Egypt, as Aybak killed Faris ad-Din Aktai, the leader of the Bahri Mamluks. Some of his Mamluks, among them Baibars al-Bunduqdari and Qalawun al-Alfi, fled to an-Nasir Yusuf in Syria, persuading him to break the accord and invade Egypt. Aybak wrote to an-Nassir Yusuf warning him of the danger of these Mamluks who took refuge in Syria, and agreed to grant him their territorial domains on the coast, but an-Nasir Yusuf refused to expel them and instead returned to them the domains which Aybak had granted.

In 1255, an-Nasir Yusuf sent new forces to the Egyptian border, this time with many of Aktai's Mamluks, among them Baibars al-Bunduqdari, and Qalawun al-Alfi, but he was defeated again.

== Relations with Crusaders ==
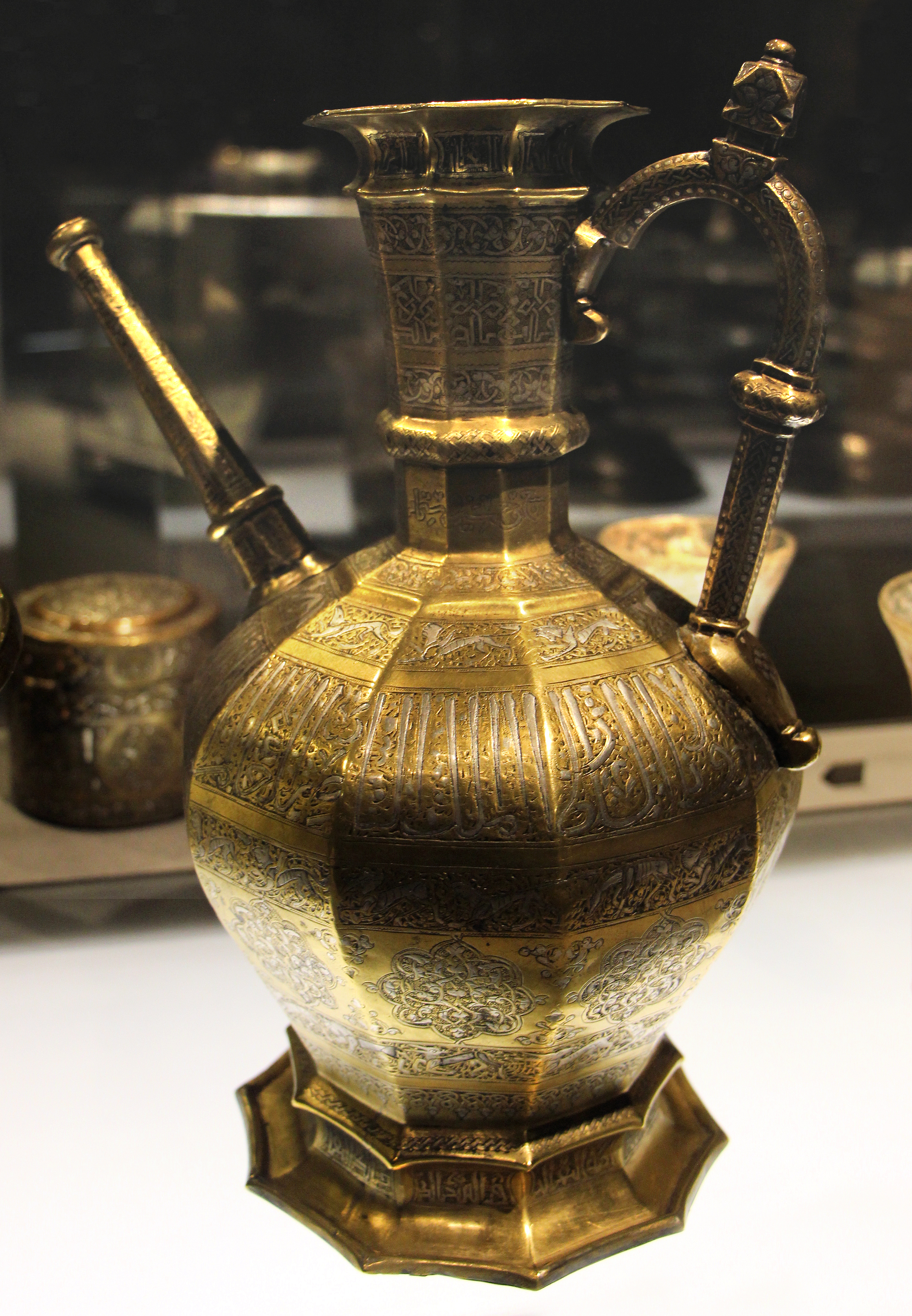
Ayyubid inlaid metal ewer, in the name of Ayyubid Sultan An-Nasir Yusuf. 1258-1259, Damascus, Syria. Louvre Museum.

An-Nasir had contact and correspondence with the European Crusaders, and tried to reach an accord with the barons of Acre. He indirectly suggested to King Louis IX of France the possibility of surrendering Jerusalem to Louis, in return for assistance in conquering Egypt. But Louis, who had already lost an army in Egypt during the Seventh Crusade and was still trying to free his imprisoned soldiers, was not willing yet to make such a deal. Louis did, however, send his royal armorer to Damascus to purchase materials to make crossbows, and in 1254, An-Nasir signed a truce with the Crusaders.

== The Mongols ==
As early as 1243-1244, An-Nasir Yusuf, while ruler of Aleppo, had sent an envoy to the Mongol ruler Arghun Aqa. In 1245-1246 he was paying tribute to the Mongols, and sent an envoy to the court of Güyük Khan in Karakorum, and again sent another to the court of the Khan in 1250.

The Egyptian ruler Aybak was murdered in 1257 and his young son al-Mansur Ali, only 15 years old, became the new sultan, with Qutuz as vice-sultan. The following year (1258) the Mongols led by Hulagu Khan sacked Baghdad.

Baibars al-Bunduqdari argued that an-Nasir Yusuf should mobilize his army and make preparations to fight the Mongols who were marching towards Syria. But instead, Yusuf sent his son al-Malik al-Aziz with a present to Hulagu, requesting Hulagu's assistance in invading Egypt. Hulagu's reply, however, was simply a warning that Yusuf should rapidly submit to Mongol authority. This answer frightened an-Nasir Yusuf, who at once sent a message to Egypt, requesting help. Saif ad-Din Qutuz, the vice-Sultan of Egypt decided to confront the Mongols. Arguing that Egypt could not face the approaching danger while ruled by a young boy, Qutuz proclaimed himself Sultan, and began to raise a large army, though he assured an-Nasir Yusuf that his action was only a temporarily measure till the danger of the Mongols was overcome.

As the Mongols marched toward Aleppo, some of an-Nasir Yusuf's advisors recommended surrendering to Hulagu as the best solution. This angered Baibars and his Mamluks who attempted to assassinate an-Nasir Yusuf, but he escaped and fled with his brother to the castle of Damascus, also sending his wife, son, and money to Egypt. Many of the citizens of Damascus also fled to Egypt.

== The sack of Aleppo ==
The Mongols arrived at Aleppo in December 1259. Turanshah, the uncle of an-Nasir Yusuf, refused to surrender. After a siege of seven days, the Mongols stormed Aleppo and massacred its population for another five days. Turanshah left the city and died a few days later. When the news of the sack of Aleppo reached an-Nasir Yusuf, he and his army fled towards Gaza on January 31, stopping at Nablus for several days and leaving a contingent which may have been intended as a rearguard.

Damascus fell to the hands of the Mongols, under general Kitbuqa, 16 days after the sack of Aleppo. The Emirs of Damascus surrendered without resistance.

After the capture of Damascus, some of the Mongol troops raided Palestine, and fought with an-Nasir's troops in the olive groves of Nablus, defeating the entire force.

Once arriving at the border with Egypt, some Emirs of an-Nasir Yusuf abandoned him and joined Qutuz. An-Nasir Yusuf, his son al-Aziz, and his brother al-Zahir were abducted in Gaza by one of his servants and were sent to Hulagu, An-Nasir and his brother were executed, after Hulagu heard the news of the defeat of the Mongol army at Ain Jalut by an Egyptian army led by Qutuz on September 3, 1260.

== See also ==
- Other Saladins

An-Nasir Yusuf Ayyubid dynasty Born: 1228 Died: 1260
Regnal titles
Preceded by Al-Aziz Muhammad	Emir of Aleppo; 26 November 1236 – 1260 with Dayfa Khatun (1236–1242)	Vacant Mongol invasions of Syria
Preceded by Al-Muazzam Turanshah	Emir of Damascus; 1250 – 1260	Vacant Mongol invasions of Syria
