= Pope John VI of Alexandria =

Head of the Coptic Church from 1189 to 1216

- Pope of Alexandria and Patriarch of the See of St. Mark
- Church: Coptic Orthodox Church
- Papacy began: 1189
- Papacy ended: 1216
- Predecessor: Mark III
- Successor: Cyril III

Personal details
- Born: Egypt
- Died: 1216 Egypt
- Buried: Church of the Holy Virgin (Babylon El-Darag)
- Denomination: Coptic Orthodox Christian
- Residence: The Hanging Church

Pope John VI of Alexandria was the 74th Pope of Alexandria and Patriarch of the See of St. Mark.

His name was John Abu al-Majd ibn Abu Ghaleb ibn Sawiris (يوحنا أبو المجد بن أبو غالب بن سويرس). He was layman. It was said that he was a widower, and after his wife's death he chose to remain celibate. He kept the church headquarters in the Hanging Church in Old Cairo (الكنيسة المعلقة). He proscribed a canon that a church could not accept a priest unknown to them without having a consent statement from his bishop. He was buried in the Church of the Darag (كنيسة الدرج) under the tomb of Pope Zakharias, the 64th Coptic Patriarch (1004–1032 AD).

In 1210, his envoys reached the city of Lalibela in Ethiopia, where they met Emperor Gebre Mesqel Lalibela.

He was the last Pope of the Coptic Orthodox Church of Alexandria to consecrate a bishop for Western Pentapolis, as the people converted to Islam under the rule of the Arabs.

Preceded by Mark III	Coptic Pope; 1189–1216	Succeeded by Cyril III
