= Qutuz =

Sultan of Egypt from 1259 to 1260

Sayf al-Din Qutuz
- The Victorious King; Sword of the Faith; Qutuz
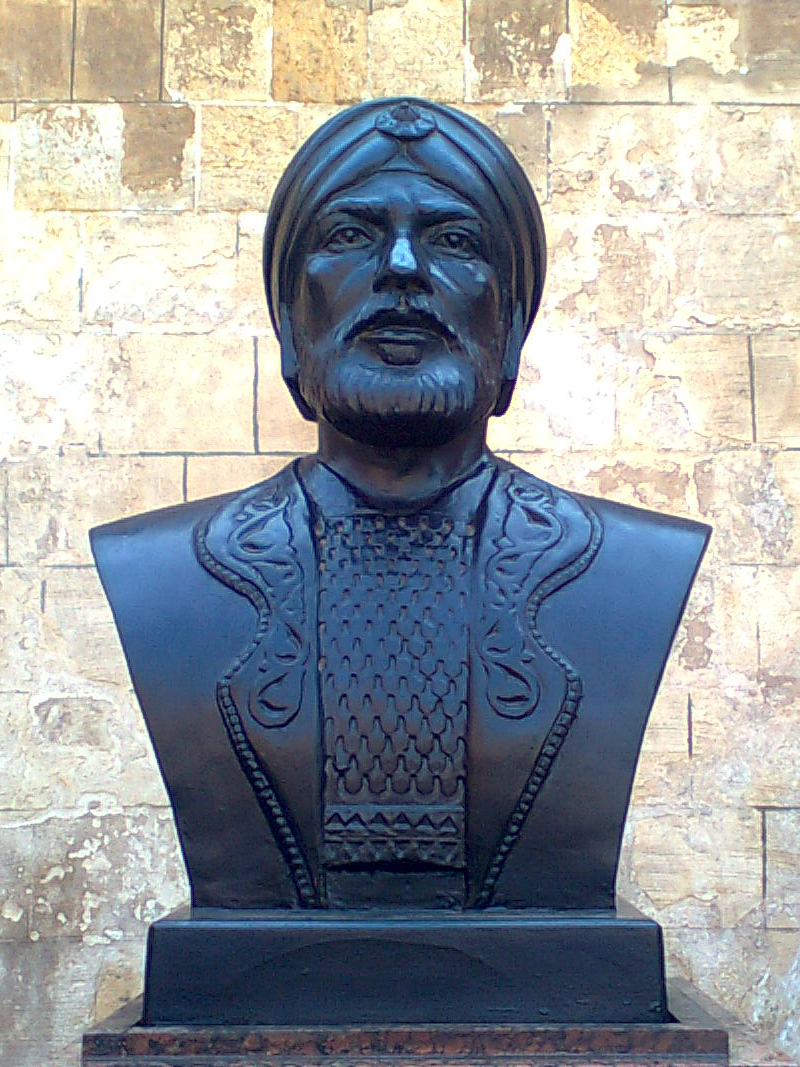
- Bust in Cairo portraying Qutuz

Sultan of Egypt
- Reign: 12 November 1259 – 24 October 1260
- Predecessor: Al-Mansur Ali
- Successor: Baybars

Sultan of Syria
- Reign: September 1260 – 24 October 1260
- Successor: Baybars
- Born: 1219 – 1221; Khwarazmian Empire
- Died: October 24 1260; Salihiyah, Egypt
- Burial: Cairo
Names
- al-Malik al-Muzaffar Sayf ad-Din Qutuz
- Religion: Islam

Sayf ad-Din Qutuz (Arabic: سيف الدين قطز; died 24 October 1260), also romanized as Kutuz or Kotuz and fully al-Malik al-Muẓaffar Sayf ad-Dīn Quṭuz (الملك المظفر سيف الدين قطز lit. 'The Victorious King, Sword of the Faith Qutuz'), was the Sultan of Egypt. He reigned as Mamluk sultan for less than a year, from 1259 until his assassination in 1260, but served as Egypt's de facto ruler since 1257.

Sold into slavery in Egypt, he rose to become vice-sultan for more than 20 years, becoming the power behind the throne. He was prominent in defeating the Seventh Crusade, which invaded Egypt in 1249–1250, where he was a commander of the Egyptian Army in the Battle of Mansurah (1250).

When Egypt was threatened by the Mongols in 1259, he took control of the military and deposed the reigning sultan, 15-year-old Sultan Al-Mansur Ali. The Mongols conquered the centers of Islamic power in Syria and Baghdad, and the center of the Islamic Empire moved to Egypt, which became their next target. Qutuz led an Egyptian Mamluk army north to confront the Mongols, who had made a pact with Egypt's long-time enemy, the Crusaders.

The Battle of Ain Jalut was fought on 3 September 1260 in southeastern Galilee between the Egyptian Mamluk army and the Mongols. In what has been considered a historical turning point, the Mongols were crushingly defeated by Qutuz's forces. Qutuz was assassinated by a fellow Mamluk leader, Baybars, on the triumphant return journey to Cairo. Although Qutuz's reign was short, he is one of the most popular Mamluk sultans in the Islamic world and holds a high position in the Islamic history and Egyptian history in general. His name Qutuz means 'rabies' or 'rabid' in Turkic languages. He received this name because he fought like a vicious beast against his captors.

== Background ==
Qutuz was a Khwarazmian prince of Turkic origin captured by the Mongols during their conquest of the Khwarazmian Empire c. 1231. He was taken to Damascus where he was sold to an Egyptian slave merchant who then sold him to Aybak, the Mamluk sultan in Cairo. According to sources, Qutuz was named Mahmud ibn Mamdud and was the nephew of Jalal al-Din, and grandson of Muhammad II of Khwarazm.

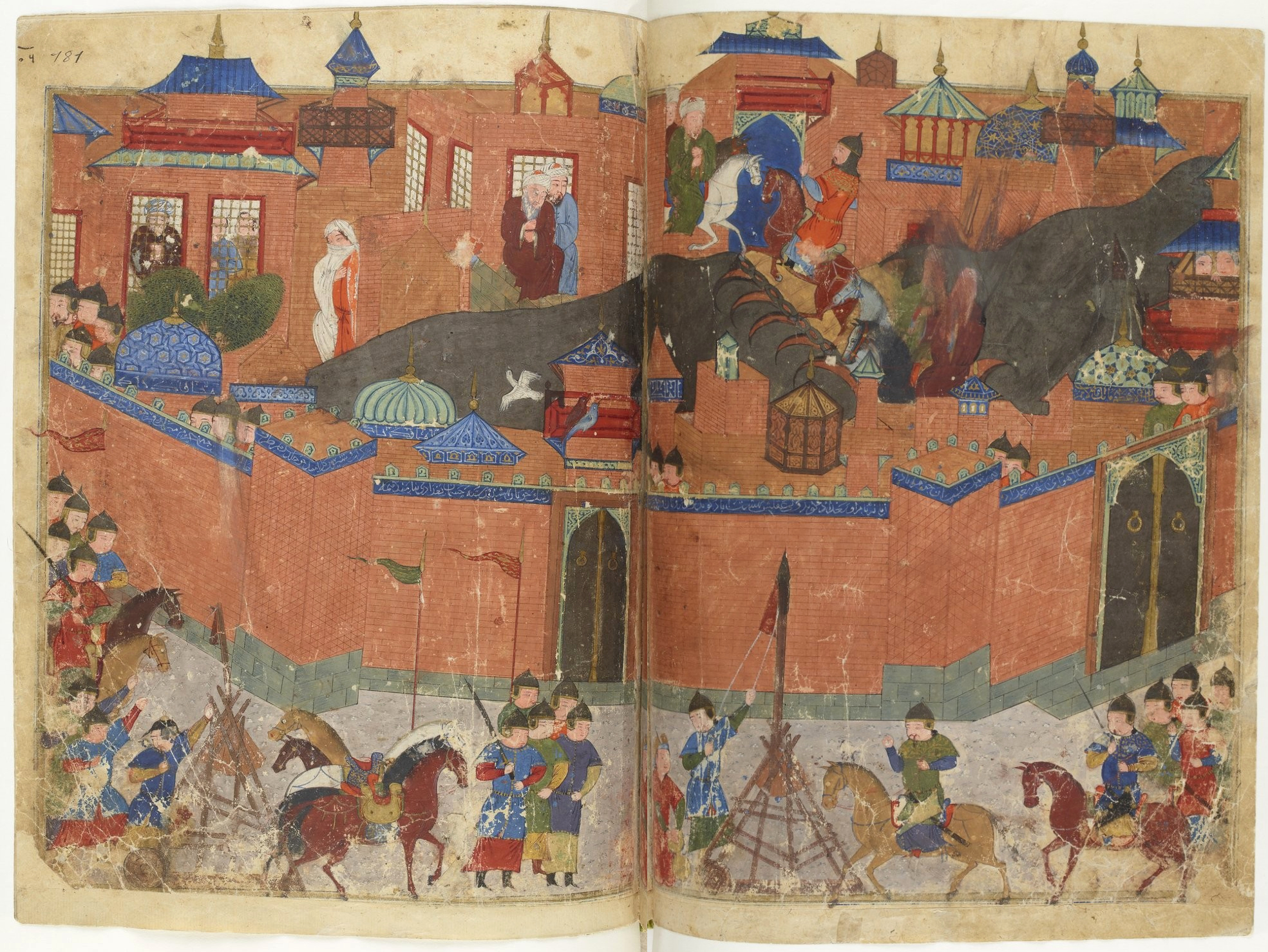
Mongols sacked Baghdad in 1258.

He became the most prominent Mu'izi Mamluk of Sultan Aybak, and then became his vice-sultan in 1253. Aybak was assassinated in 1257, and Qutuz remained as vice-sultan for Aybak's son al-Mansur Ali. Qutuz led the Mu'izi Mamluks who had arrested Aybak's widow Shajar al-Durr and installed al-Mansur Ali as the new sultan of Egypt. In November 1257 and April 1258, he defeated raids from the forces of al-Malik al-Mughith (Note: Al-Malik al-Mughith Omar Ben al-Adil II Ben al-Kamil Muhammed (الملك المغيث عمر بن العادل الثانى بن الكامل محمد) was the Ayyubid ruler of Al Karak. During the reign of Sultan Baibars, he was killed in the Citadel of Cairo.) of Al-Karak which were supported by the Bahriyya Mamluks. (Note: After the assassination of Faris ad-Din Aktai the leader of the Bahariyya Mamluks, during the reign of Sultan Aybak, many Bahariyya Mamluks fled from Egypt. Baibars, Qalawun, and other prominent Mamluks took refuge in Syria. Still, after a dispute with an-Nasir Yusuf, the Ayyubid king of Syria, they moved to Al Karak, which an Ayyubid king also ruled.) The raids caused a dispute among the Bahriyya Mamluks in Al-Karak as some of them wanted to support their followers in Egypt. (Note: During the reign of Sultan Aybak many Bahari Mamluks fled from Egypt after their leader Faris ad-Din Aktai was assassinated. They stayed in Syria, Al Karak, and the Seljuk Sultanate of Rûm. Two of the most prominent Mamluks Baibars al-Bunduqdari and Qalawun al-Alfi went to Syria then to Al Karak, where they persuaded al-Malik al-Mughith the Ayyubid king of Al Karak to attack Egypt. (See also Aybak, Al-Mansur Ali and an-Nasir Yusuf))

In February 1258, the Mongol army sacked Baghdad, massacred its inhabitants and killed the Abbasid Caliph Al-Musta'sim. They then advanced towards present-day Syria, which was then ruled by the Ayyubid ruler an-Nasir Yusuf, who received a threatening letter from Hulagu. (Note: The message was given by Hulagu to an-Nasir's son al-Malik al-Aziz. Some of its passages said: "As al-Malik an-Nasir the ruler of Aleppo knows, we have conquered Baghdad by the sword of the almighty God, we killed its knights, we razed its buildings and we captured its inhabitants. When you receive this message, you should at once submit with your men, your money and your knights to the king of kings the ruler of the earth. By doing that you can be saved from his evil and gain his goodness. We have heard that the merchants of the Levant and others have fled with their money and women to Egypt. If they hide in mountains we will raze the mountains and if they hide in the earth we will sink the earth down. Where is safety? None can flee because I own both the land and the sea. The lions were despised by our dignity and the princes and the viziers are held in my grasp.") Vice-Sultan Qutuz and the Egyptian Emirs were alarmed by a message from an-Nasir Yusuf in which he appealed for immediate help from Egypt. The emirs assembled at the court of the 15-year-old Sultan Al-Mansur Ali, and Qutuz told them that because of the seriousness of the situation, Egypt should have a strong and capable sultan who could fight the Mongols. On 12 November 1259, Al-Mansur Ali was deposed by Qutuz. When Qutuz became the new sultan, he promised the emirs that they could install any other sultan after he defeated the Mongols.

Qutuz kept Emir Faris ad-Din Aktai al-Mostareb (Note: Not to be confused with his namesake and contemporary Faris ad-Din Aktai al-Jemdar who was the leader of the Bahari Mamluks and who was assassinated by Al-Mansur Ali's father Sultan Aybak.) as the Atabeg of the Egyptian army and began to prepare for battle.

== Mongol threat ==
The 1260 Mongol offensives in the Levant. The early successful attacks on Aleppo and Damascus led to smaller attacks on secondary targets such as Baalbek, al-Subayba and Ajlun as well as raids against other Palestine towns, perhaps including Jerusalem. Smaller raiding parties reached as far south as Gaza.

Hulagu and his forces were proceeding towards Damascus. Some Syrian emirs suggested that an-Nasir Yusuf surrender and submit to Hulagu, as the best solution was to save themselves and Syria. Baibars, who was present at the meeting, was upset by the suggestion, (Note: The surrendering to Hulagu suggestion was uttered by the Syrian Emir Zain ad-Din al-Hafizi. Baibars, who was outraged, struck and insulted the Emir, saying to an-Nasir Yusuf and his Emirs: "You are the reason of the destruction of the Muslims!") and the Mamluks decided to kill an-Nasir Yusuf that night. However, he escaped with his brother to the citadel of Damascus. Baibars and the Mamluks then left Syria, traveling to Egypt where they were warmly welcomed by Sultan Qutuz, who granted Baibars the town of Qalyub. (Note: Qalyub is a town in the Qalyubia Governorate now, north of Cairo.) When an-Nasir Yusuf heard that the Mongol army was approaching Aleppo, he sent his wife, his son and his money to Egypt. The population of Damascus and other Syrian towns began to flee. After besieging Aleppo for seven days, the Mongols sacked it and massacred its population. When an-Nasir Yusuf heard about the fall of Aleppo, he fled to Egypt, leaving Damascus and its remaining population defenseless, but Qutuz denied him entry. An-Nasir Yusuf thus stayed on the border of Egypt while his emirs deserted him and proceeded into the country. Sultan Qutuz ordered the seizing of an-Nasir Yusuf's jewelry and money, which were sent to Egypt with his wife and servants. Sixteen days after the fall of Aleppo to the Mongols, Damascus surrendered without a fight. An-Nasir Yusuf was taken prisoner by the Mamluks and sent to Hulagu. (Note: An-Nasir Yusuf, his son al-Aziz, and his brother al-Zahir were abducted in Gaza by one of his servants and were sent to Hulagu. In another account, an-Nasir went to Kitbuga, who arrested him and sent him to Hulagu.)

With the centers of Islamic power in Syria and Baghdad conquered, the center of the Islamic power transferred to Egypt and became Hulagu's next target. Hulagu sent messengers to Cairo with a threatening letter, urging Qutuz to surrender and submit to the Mongols. (Note: From the King of Kings in the East and the West, the mighty Khan: In your name, O God, You who laid out the earth and raised up the skies. Let al-Malik al-Muzaffar Qutuz, who is of the race of Mamluks who fled before our swords into this country, who enjoyed its comforts and then killed its rulers, let al-Malik al-Muzzafar Qutuz know, as well as the Emirs of his state and the people of his kingdom, in Egypt and in the adjoining countries, that we are the army of God on His earth. He created us from his wrath and urged us against those who incurred His anger. In all lands there are examples to admonish you and to deter you from challenging our resolve. Be warned by the fate of others and hand over your power to us before the veil is torn and you are sorry and your errors are rebound upon you. For we do not pity those who weep, nor are we tender to those who complain. You have heard that we have conquered the lands and cleansed the earth of corruption and killed most of the people. Yours to flee: ours to pursue. And what land will shelter you, what road save you; what country protect you? You have no deliverance from our swords and you cannot avoid dreading us for our horses are swift, our arrows do pierce, our swords like thunder-bolts, our hearts like rocks and our numbers like sand. Fortresses cannot withstand us; armies are of no avail in fighting us. Your prayers against us will not be heard, for you have eaten forbidden things and your speech is foul, you betray oaths and promises, and disobedience and fractiousness prevail among you. Be informed that your lot will be shame and humiliation. "Today you are recommenced with the punishment of humiliation, because you were so proud on earth without right and for your wrongdoing" (Quran, xlvi, 20). "Those who have done wrong will know to what end they will revert" (Quran,xxvi. 227). Those who make war against us are sorry; those who seek our protection are safe. If you submit to our orders and conditions, then your rights and duties are the same as ours. If you resist you will be destroyed. Do not, therefore, destroy yourselves with your own hands. He who is warned should be on his guard. You are convinced that we are the infidels, and we are convinced that you are debauchers. God, who determines all and judges all, has urged us against you. What much for you is little for us, the honorable for you is base for us. Your kings should expect nothing from us except humiliation. Therefore, do not wait long but quickly answer us before the fire of war is set and the spark is thrown over you then You will not have from us dignity, nor comfort, nor protection, nor sanctuary and you will suffer at our hands the most fearful calamity, and your land will be empty of you. By writing to you we have dealt equitably with you and have awakened you by warning you. Now we have no other purpose but you. Peace be with both us and you, and with all of those who follow divine guidance, who fear the consequences of evil and who obey the Supreme King. Say to Egypt, Hulagu has come with swords unsheathed and sharp. The mightiest of her people will become humble and he will send their children to join the aged." (Letter from Hulagu to Qutuz)) Qutuz's response was to execute the messengers. They were sliced in half, and their heads were mounted on the Bab Zuweila gate in Cairo. Then, rather than waiting for the Mongols to attack, Qutuz decided to raise an army to engage them outside of Egypt. Moroccans who resided in Egypt fled westward, while Yemenis escaped to Yemen and Hejaz.

Qutuz went to Al-Salihiyya (Note: Also, 'As Salhiyah' in north Egypt, east of the Nile Delta. In Sharqia Governorate now.) and assembled his commanders to decide on when to march against the Mongols. But the emirs showed timidity. Qutuz shamed them into joining him with the statement, "Emirs of the Muslims, for some time now you have been fed by the country treasury and you hate to be invaded. I will go alone and who likes to join me should do that and who does not like to join me should go back home, but who will not join will carry the sin of not defending our women."

Qutuz ordered Baibars to lead a force to Gaza to observe the small Mongol garrison there, which Baibars easily defeated. After spending a day in Gaza, Qutuz led his army along the coast towards Acre, a city that remains a remnant of the Kingdom of Jerusalem Crusader state. The Crusaders were traditional enemies of the Mamluks and had been approached by the Mongols about forming a Franco-Mongol alliance. However, the Crusaders recognized the Mongols as the greater threat that year. Qutuz suggested a military alliance with the Crusaders against the Mongols, but the Crusaders opted to stay neutral. However, they allowed Qutuz and his forces to travel unmolested through Crusader territory and to camp and resupply near the Crusader stronghold of Acre. Qutuz and his army stayed there for three days until they heard that the Mongols had crossed the Jordan River, at which point Qutuz and Baibars led their forces to meet the Mongols at Ain Jalut.

== Battle of Ain Jalut ==
Troop movements leading up to the Battle of Ain Jalut

The Battle of Ain Jalut was fought on 3 September 1260, and was one of the most important battles and a turning point in history. In 1250, only ten years before the battle, the Bahariyya Mamluks (Qutuz, Baibars and Qalawun) led Egypt against the Seventh Crusade of King Louis IX of France. The Mongol army at Ain Jalut was led by Kitbuqa, a Nestorian Christian Naiman Mongol, and accompanied by the Christian king of Cilician Armenia and also by the Christian prince of Antioch. After the fall of Khawarezm, Baghdad and Syria, Egypt was the last citadel of Islam in the Middle East, and the existence of crusade beach-heads along the coast of the Levant presented a serious menace to the Islamic world. Therefore, the future of Islam and the Christian west as well depended on the outcome of that battle.

Baibars, known to be a swift commander, led the vanguard and succeeded in his maneuver and lured the Mongol army to Ain Jalut, where the Egyptian army led by Qutuz waited. The Egyptians at first failed to counter the Mongol attack and were scattered after the left flank of their army suffered severe damage, but Qutuz stood firm; he threw his helmet into the air and shouted "O Islam", and advanced towards the damaged side, followed by his unit. The Mongols were pushed back and fled to the vicinity of Beisan, Qutuz's forces quickly followed them, but they managed to gather and returned to the battlefield making a successful counterattack. Qutuz cried loudly three times, "O Islam! O God grant your servant Qutuz a victory against the Mongols". The Mongols with their Christian allies were then defeated by Qutuz's army and fled to Syria where they became prey for the local population. Qutuz kissed the ground and prayed while the soldiers collected the booty. His leadership during the battle earned him the enduring popular honorific "The Lion of Ain Jalut" (Arabic: أسد عين جالوت. Kitbuqa, the Commander of the Mongol army, was killed, and his head was sent to Cairo.

This was the first defeat suffered by the Mongols since they attacked the Islamic world. They fled from Damascus, then from the whole of the northern Levant. Qutuz entered Damascus with his army and sent Baibars to Homs to liquidate the remaining Mongols. While Qutuz nominated Alam ad-Din Sonjar as the sultan's deputy in Damascus, Qutuz granted Aleppo to al-Malik al-Said Ala'a ad-Din as the Emir of Mosul; also a new Abbasid Caliph was about to be installed by Qutuz. (Note: While in Damascus, Qutuz chose an Abbasid named Abu al-Abbas Ahmad to become the new Abbasid Chaliph. After the assassination of Qutuz, Baibars invited Abu al-Abbas to Cairo. Still, before his arrival, another Abbasid named Abu al-Qasim Ahmad arrived in Cairo and was installed by Baibars as the new Chaliph. Qutuz's candidate Abu al-Abbas returned to Syria.) The Levant region from the border of Egypt to the river Euphrates was freed from the Mongols' control. After this victory, the Mamluks stretched their sovereignty to the Levant and were recognized by the Ayyubids and the others as legitimate rulers. When Hulagu heard about the defeat of the Mongol Army, he executed An-Nasir Yusuf near Tabriz. (Note: Hulagu executed An-Nasir Yusuf and his brother al-Zahir Ghazi near Tabriz. Tuquz Khaton, wife of Hulagu, appealed for the life of Yusuf's son al-Aziz, and he was not executed.) Hulagu kept threatening the Mamluk Sultanate, but soon he was struck hard by conflicts with the Mongols of the Golden Horde, in the western half of the Eurasian Steppe during the Berke–Hulagu war. Hulagu died in 1265 and would never avenge the defeat of the Mongols at Ain Jalut.

Some of the earliest explosive hand cannons (midfa in Arabic) were employed by the Mamluk Egyptians during the battle to frighten the Mongol horses and cavalry and cause disorder in their ranks. The Mamluks under Qutuz then went on to take back most of Iraq and Syria. The last city the Mamluks retook before his assassination was the city of Damascus.

== Assassination ==
On his way back to Cairo, Qutuz was assassinated while on a hunting expedition in Salihiyah. According to both modern and medieval Muslim historians such as al-Maqrizi, Baibars was involved in the assassination. Al-Maqrizi further explains that the emirs who struck down Qutuz were Emir Badr ad-Din Baktut, Emir Ons and Emir Bahadir al-Mu'izzi. Western historians mention that Baibars was in on the conspiracy and assign him direct responsibility. Muslim chroniclers from the Mamluk era stated that Baibars' motivation was either to avenge the killing of his friend, the leader of the Bahariyya Faris ad-Din Aktai during Sultan Aybak's reign or due to Qutuz's decision to grant Aleppo to al-Malik al-Said Ala'a ad-Din the Emir of Mosul, instead of to Baibars as had promised to him before the Battle of Ain Jalut. (Note: Different medieval historians supply contradicting accounts. Al-Maqrizi and Ibn Taghri say that the assassins killed Qutuz while he was giving his hand to Baibars. Abu Al-Fida says that Qutuz was giving his hand to someone else when Baibars struck his back with a sword. Hassan, O. says that Baibars tried to help Qutuz against the assassins.)

Qutuz was first buried in Al-Qusair and then reburied in a cemetery in Cairo, Egypt. Baibars returned to Cairo, which was undergoing celebrations on the victory over the Mongols, where he became the new sultan.

== Coins ==
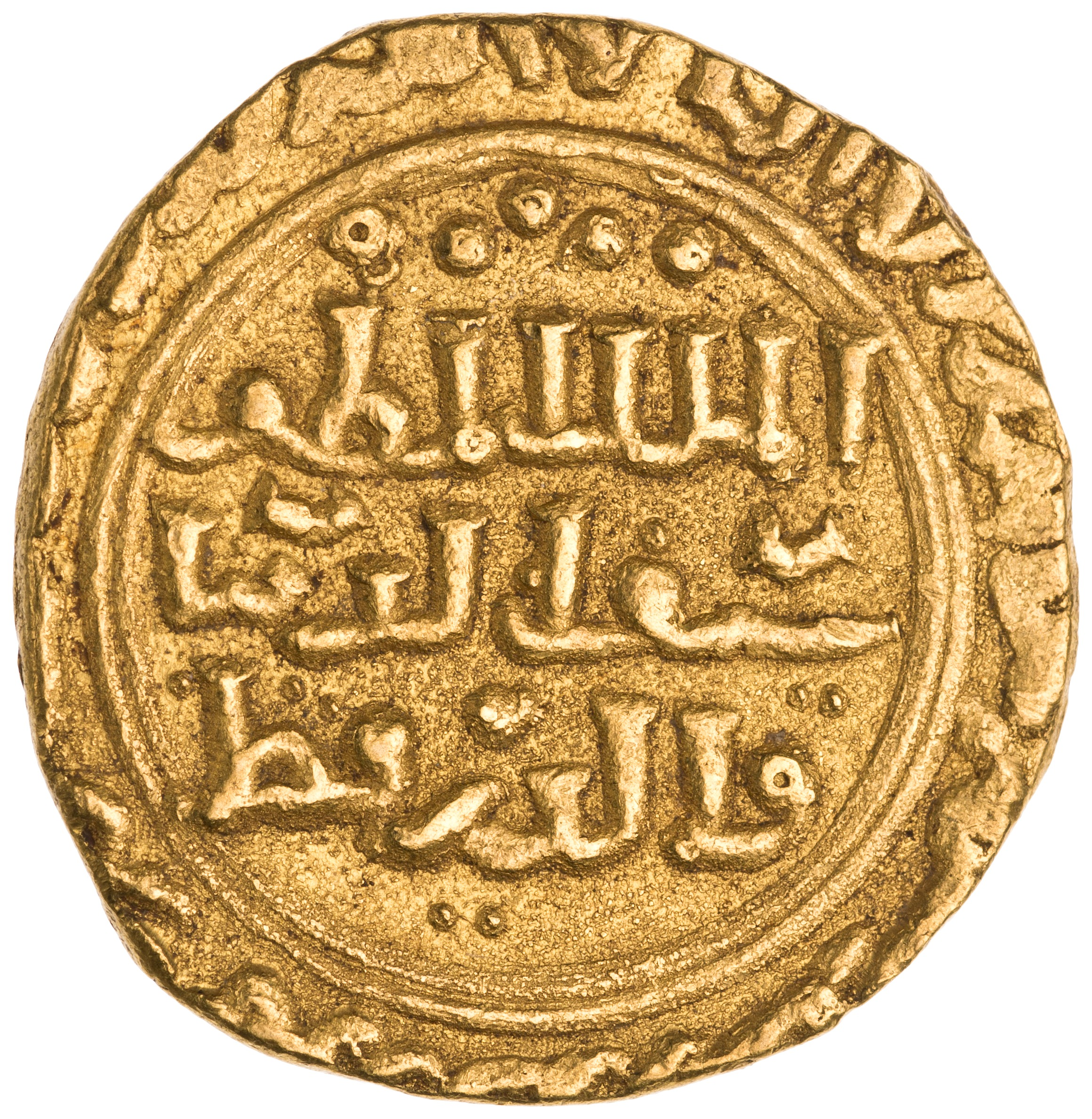
Gold dinar of Sultan Qutuz, minted in Alexandria in 1260

The coins during the reign of Qutuz are unique in the history of Mamluk coinages as no other names except his names and titles were inscribed on them: al-Malik al-Muzafar Saif al-Donya wa al-Din ("The victorious king, sword of the temporal world and of the faith") and al-Muzafar Saif al-Din ("The victorious sword of faith").

== See also ==
- List of rulers of Egypt
- Mosque of Amr ibn al-As

== Sources ==
- Abu al-Fida, The Concise History of Humanity
- Al-Maqrizi, Al Selouk Leme'refatt Dewall al-Melouk, Dar al-kotob, 1997.
- Al-Maqrizi, al-Mawaiz wa al-'i'tibar bi dhikr al-khitat wa al-'athar, Matabat aladab, Cairo 1996, ISBN 977-241-175-X.
- Al-Maqrīzī, Aḥmad ibn ʻAlī Taqī al-Dīn (1895). Description topographique et historique de l'Egypte (in French). Translated by Bouriant, Urbain. Paris. OCLC 758313479.
- Al-Qalqashandi, Sobh al-Asha Fi sena'at al-Insha, Dar Alkotob, Cairo 1913.
- Amitai-Preiss, Reuven (1995). Mongols and Mamluks: The Mamluk-Ilkhanid War, 1260–1281. Cambridge: Cambridge University Press. ISBN 978-0-521-46226-6.
- Chronicles of the Crusades: being contemporary narratives of the crusade of Richard Coeur de Lion by Richard of Devizes and Geoffrey de Vinsauf; and of the crusade of St. Louis by Lord John de Joinville. (London: H. G. Bohn, 1848; reissued New York: AMS Press, 1969)
- Fahmi, Dr. Abd al-Rahman, al-Niqood al-Arabiya (Arabic coins), Mat Misr, Cairo 1964.
- Hassan, O, Al-Zahir Baibars, Dar Alamal, Cairo 1997, ISBN 977-5823-09-9.
- Holt, P. M.; Lambton, Ann; Lewis, Bernard (2005) The Cambridge History of Islam, Vol. 1A: The Central Islamic Lands from Pre-Islamic Times to the First World War, Cambridge University Press, ISBN 978-0-521-29135-4.
- Ibn Aybak Al-Dwedar, Kinz al-Dorar wa Jamia al-Ghorar, Hans Robert Roemer, Cairo.
- Ibn Taghri, al-Nujum al-Zahirah Fi Milook Misr wa al-Qahirah, al-Hay'ah al-Misreyah 1968.
- Ibn-Taġrībirdī, Abu-'l-Maḥāsin Yūsuf Ibn-ʻAbdallāh (1954). History of Egypt, 1382–1469 A.D. Translated by Popper, William. Berkeley, CA: University of California Press.
- Little, D.P. (1986). "Kutuz, al-Malik al-Muzaffar Sayf al-Din al-Mu'izzi". In Bosworth, C.E.; Van Donzel, E.; Lewis, B.; Pellat, Ch. (eds.). Encyclopaedia of Islam. Vol. V: Khe-Mahi. E.J. Brill. pp. 571–572. ISBN 90 04 07819 3.
- Masters, Bruce (2013). The Arabs of the Ottoman Empire, 1516-1918. Cambridge: Cambridge University Press. p. 22. ISBN 978-1107033634.
- Mawsoa Thakafiya (Culture encyclopedia), Franklin Publishing, Cairo 1973.
- Perry, Glenn E. (2004) The History of Egypt, Greenwood Publishing Group, ISBN 978-0-313-32264-8.
- Qasim, Abdu Qasim, Dr., Asr Salatin AlMamlik (era of the Mamluk Sultans), Eye for human and social studies, Cairo 2007.
- Riley-Smith, Jonathan (2001) The Oxford Illustrated History of the Crusades, Oxford University Press US, ISBN 978-0-19-285428-5.
- Shayyal, Jamal, Prof. of Islamic history, Tarikh Misr al-Islamiyah (History of Islamic Egypt), dar al-Maref, Cairo 1266, ISBN 977-02-5975-6.
- The New Encyclopædia Britannica, Macropædia, H.H. Berton Publisher, 1973–1974.
- Toynbee, Arnold J., Mankind and mother earth, Oxford University Press, 1976.
- Tschanz, David W. (July–August 2007). "History's Hinge: 'Ain Jalut". Saudi Aramco World. Archived from the original on 12 September 2007..

Qutuz Bahri dynasty Cadet branch of the Mamluk Sultanate Born: ? Died: 24 October 1260
Regnal titles
| Preceded by Al-Mansur Ali | Sultan of Egypt; November 1259 – 24 October 1260 | Succeeded by Baibars |
| Vacant Annexed after Battle of Ain Jalut | Sultan of Syria; September 1260 – 24 October 1260 | Succeeded by Baibars |
