= Al-Mansur Ali =

Mamluk sultan of Egypt from 1257 to 1259

Al-Mansur Ali المنصور علي
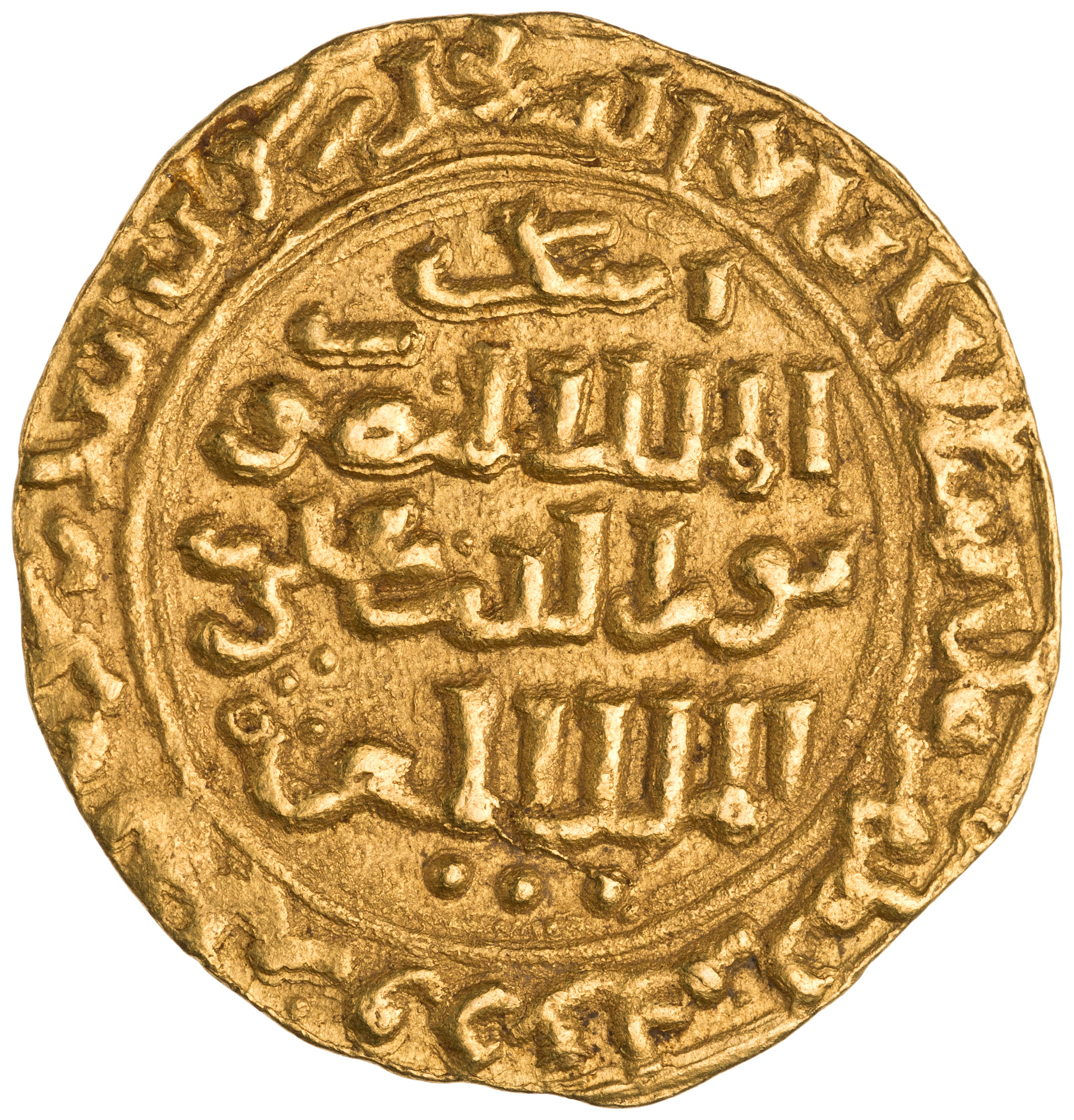
- Gold dinar of al-Mansur Nur ad-Din Ali

Sultan of Egypt
- Reign: 1257–1259
- Predecessor: Izz al-Din Aybak
- Successor: Saif ad-Din Qutuz
- Born: Ali c. 1242; Cairo
- Died: after 1266
Names
- Al-Malik Al-Manṣūr Nūr ad-dīn ʾAlī ibn Aybak الملك المنصور نور الدين علي بن أيبك
Era name and dates
- Bahri Mamluks: 1250, 1254–1382, 1389
- Father: Aybak
- Religion: Sunni Islam

Al-Mansur Ali (Arabic: المنصور على, epithet: al-Malik al-Manṣūr Nūr ad-dīn ʾAlī ibn Aybak, Arabic: الملك المنصور نور الدين علي بن أيبك) (b. c. 1242) was the second of the Mamluk Sultans of Egypt in the Turkic, or Bahri, line. Some historians, however, consider Shajar al-Durr as the first of the Mamluk Sultans; thus, to them Al-Mansur Ali was the third Mamluk Sultan and not the second. He ruled from 1257 to 1259 after the assassination of his father Aybak during a turbulent period that witnessed the Mongols invasion of the Islamic world.

== Bibliography ==
- Shayal, Jamal, Prof. of Islamic history, Tarikh Misr al-Islamiyah (History of Islamic Egypt), dar al-Maref, Cairo 1266, ISBN 977-02-5975-6

Al-Mansur Ali Mamluk Sultanate Born: c.1242 Died: ?
Regnal titles
Preceded by Izz al-Din Aybak	Sultan of Egypt; 1257–1259	Succeeded by Saif ad-Din Qutuz
