= Faris al-Din Aktay =

Faris al-Din Aktay al-Jamdar (Arabic: فارس الدين أقطاى الجمدار) (d. 1254, Cairo) was a Turkic-Kipchak Emir (prince) and the leader of the Mamluks of the Bahri dynasty.

== Biography ==
When the Ayyubid Sultan as-Salih Ayyub died Aktay was sent to Hasankeyf to recall Turanshah, the son and heir of the dead sultan, to Egypt. During the Battle of al-Mansurah he was one of the Mamluk commanders who defeated the Frankish forces led by the French king Louis IX.

Aktay was one of the Mamluks who collaborated in the murdering of Turanshah after the battle of al-Mansurah.

During the era of Sultan Aybak, he led the Egyptian forces that defeated the army of the Ayyubid ruler of Syria an-Nasir Yusuf at Gaza in October 1250 and, as a general, he played a crucial role in the final defeat of an-Nasir Yusuf in the Battle of al-Kura.

In 1251 he conquered parts of Syria and in 1252 the port city of Alexandria in northern Egypt became his own domain. He was known for his devotion to Islam and harsh treatment towards the Christian minority.

In 1252, together with Faris al-Din Aktay al-Musta'rib, he suppressed a major rebellion led by al-Sharif Hisn al-Din Tha'lab in Middle and Upper Egypt.

Feeling that Aktay and his Mamluks were defying his authority and almost installed a state within his state, Aybak decided to kill him. In a conspiracy involving Aybak, Qutuz and some other Mamluks, Aktay was murdered in the sultan's fort and his Mamluks, including his friend Baybars al-Bunduqdari, fled to Syria and al-Karak.
