= Lists of rulers of Egypt =

Lists of rulers of Egypt:

- List of pharaohs (c. 3100 BC – 30 BC)
  - List of satraps of the 27th dynasty (525–404 BC)
  - List of satraps of the 31st dynasty (343–332 BC)
- List of governors of Roman Egypt (30 BC – AD 639)
  - Roman pharaohs (30 BC – AD 313)
  - List of Sasanian governors of Egypt (618–628)
- List of rulers of Islamic Egypt (640–1517)
  - List of Rashidun emirs (640–658)
  - List of Umayyad wali (659–750)
  - List of Abbasid governors, First Period (750–868)
  - List of Tulunid emirs (868–905)
  - List of Abbasid governors, Second Period (905–935)
  - List of Ikhshidid emirs (935–969)
  - List of Fatimid caliphs (969–1171)
  - List of Ayyubid rulers (1171–1250)
  - List of Mamluk sultans (1250–1517)
- List of Ottoman governors of Egypt (1517–1805)
- List of monarchs of the Muhammad Ali dynasty (1805–1953)
  - List of British colonial heads of Egypt (1798–1956)
  - List of Grand Viziers of Egypt (1857–1878)
- List of presidents of Egypt (1953–present)
  - List of prime ministers of Egypt (1878–present)

== See also ==
- Lists of office-holders
