= Al-Salih =

Al-Salih ('pious') or as-Salih may refer to:

- As-Salih Ismail al-Malik (1163–1181), Zengid ruler in the 13th century
- Al-Salih Ismail, Emir of Damascus (died 1245), Ayyubid ruler of Damascus in the 13th century
- As-Salih Ayyub (1205–1249), Ayyubid sultan of Egypt from 1240 to 1249
- Al-Salih Ismail, Sultan of Egypt (1326–1345), Mamluk sultan of Egypt from 1342 to 1345
- As-Salih Salih (1337–1360), Mamluk sultan of Egypt from 1351 to 1354
- Al-Salih Hajji (1372–1412), Mamluk sultan of Egypt from 1381 to 1382
