= Mausoleum of Shajar al-Durr =

Historic monument and mausoleum in Cairo, Egypt

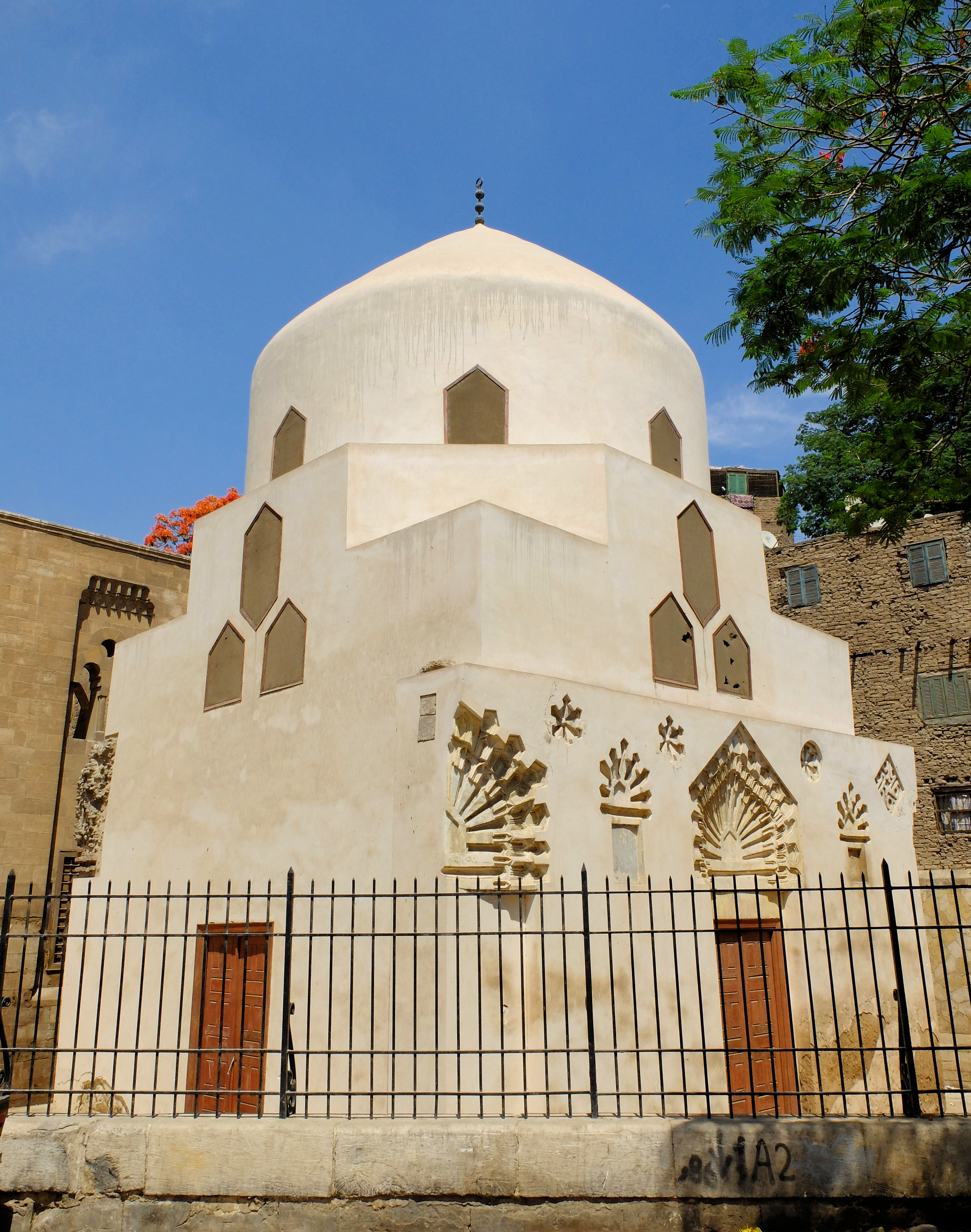

Religion
- Affiliation: Islam

Location
- Location: Cairo, Egypt
- Interactive map of Mausoleum of Shajar al-Durr
- Coordinates: 30°01′33.3″N 31°15′7.5″E

Architecture
- Type: Mausoleum
- Style: late Ayyubid architecture
- Completed: circa 1250
- Dome: 1

The Mausoleum of Shajar al-Durr is a mausoleum housing the tomb of the female Ayyubid sultan Shajar al-Durr in Cairo, Egypt. It is located on al-Khalifa Street or Shurafa Street, in a neighbourhood on the edge of the al-Qarafa cemeteries. Its construction was commissioned by Shajar al-Durr herself and it is believed to have been built in the Islamic year 648 AH (1250 CE). Shajar al-Durr was notable for being the only female Muslim ruler in Egyptian history and for playing a crucial role in the transition from Ayyubid rule to Mamluk rule. The mausoleum serves as the formal resting place of the queen and commemorates her legacy. Architectural features of this structure, along with the broader architectural patronage of Shajar al-Durr, influenced future Mamluk architecture.

== Historical background ==
=== Life and political role of Shajar al-Durr ===
Shajar al-Durr was an Ayyubid queen and architectural patron who reigned formally as the official sultan of Egypt for eighty days in May, June, and July 1250 C.E. following the death of her first husband, Sultan al-Salih Najm al-Din Ayyub. In her lifetime, her status changed from slave-concubine wife, regent, widow, and sultan. She is variously referred to as Shajar al-Durr or Shajarat al-Durr ("Tree of Pearls"), the mother of the Sultan's son, or by her Muslim name, ‘Ismat al-Dunya wa al-Din ("Virtue of the World and the Religion").

Born a slave of Turkic origins, Shajar al-Durr was given to Sultan al-Salih as a gift and eventually became the sultan's wife. They had a son named al-Ashraf Khalil in 1238 C.E. but he did not survive beyond a few months. The birth of al-Ashraf Khalil impacted Shajar al-Durr's social standing and endowed her with political stature. Al-Salih died in 1249 during a campaign against Louis IX, who led the Seventh Crusade, resulting in a dangerous succession crisis in a time of war.

After initially overseeing a transition of power to al-Salih's son Al-Muazzam Turanshah, she allied herself with the Mamluks, then the most powerful component of the Ayyubid army, who assassinated Turanshah and recognized Shajar al-Durr as sultan in 1250. Through historians we can then take note that her brief reign which some at the time may have considered an absence of a ruler, served as a catalyst that dissolved Ayyubid power to establish the Mamluk Sultanate, ruling for the next 250 years until conquered by the Ottoman Empire in 1517. Eventually she was pressured to allow a man to formally rule, which she did by marrying Izz al-Din Aybak, the Mamluk military commander. She remained a powerful figure at the side of Aybak, who formally replaced her as the sultan for seven years. In 1257, upon learning that Aybak was planning to marry another woman and establish his independence from her, she arranged to have him murdered. This caused a violent response from the Mamluks, who imprisoned her. It is alleged that she was then murdered in prison by Aybak's concubines and her body was thrown from the walls of the Citadel. Her body was left exposed for a time before it was interred at her mausoleum.

Shajar al-Durr's reign marked the end of the Ayyubid dynasty’s rule of Egypt, Syria, and the Jazira, and the start of the Mamluks rule, an elite corps of military slaves beginning in 1250 C.E. Her architectural patronage of building complexes in Cairo, which combined the civic function of education with the commemorative function of the memorial, had a lasting impact on Islamic architecture.

=== Architectural patronage by Shajar al-Durr ===
Shajar al-Durr was a notable architectural patron in Cairo. Her architectural patronage and status as Sultan al-Salih’s favorite wife allowed her to establish her own power and legitimacy; "as a woman, former slave, and an affine (related through marriage but not blood) of the Ayyubid household, her position could not be anything but precarious". Under al-Salih, Shajar al-Durr commissioned a throne room known as the Martabat Khatun, or Dais of the Lady, within the Cairo Citadel from which she would later rule. According to historian al-Maqrizi, Shajar al-Durr also commissioned a personal residence attached to a Tulunid palace near the Al-Sayyida Nafisa Mosque.

Sultan Al-Salih Ayyub died in 1249 at the age of 44. Following his death, the responsibility of commissioning a mausoleum fell upon Shajar al-Durr after al-Salih's son Turanshah was unwilling to complete the task. Al-Durr selected a space adjacent to the Salihiyya madrasa, an educational institution founded by al-Salih himself, as the location of his tomb in commemoration of his good deeds. The construction of this mausoleum occurred over a time period of approximately six months. Shajar al-Durr commissioned her own mausoleum later that same year.

=== Construction of the mausoleum complex ===
After overseeing the construction of al-Salih's mausoleum, Shajar al-Durr sponsored the construction of her own funerary complex, which included her mausoleum and several other structures. The mausoleum is built of brick and mortar, with stucco embellishments. Although the mausoleum's foundation inscription does not record the date, scholars date its construction or completion to 1250 CE (648 AH). It was built in an old cemetery to the southeast of the Citadel which was already associated with the tombs or shrines of several important female Muslim religious figures, including Sayyida Ruqayya (commemorated by the nearby Mashhad of Sayyida Ruqayya) and Sayyida Nafisa (whose tomb is attached to the present Mosque of Sayyida Nafisa). However, Shajar al-Durr's construction was the first funerary complex in this area to be built for a ruler. Perhaps in part because of the religious character of this location, Shajar al-Durr's tomb eventually became a popular shrine itself, despite the violent end to her political career.

== Architecture ==
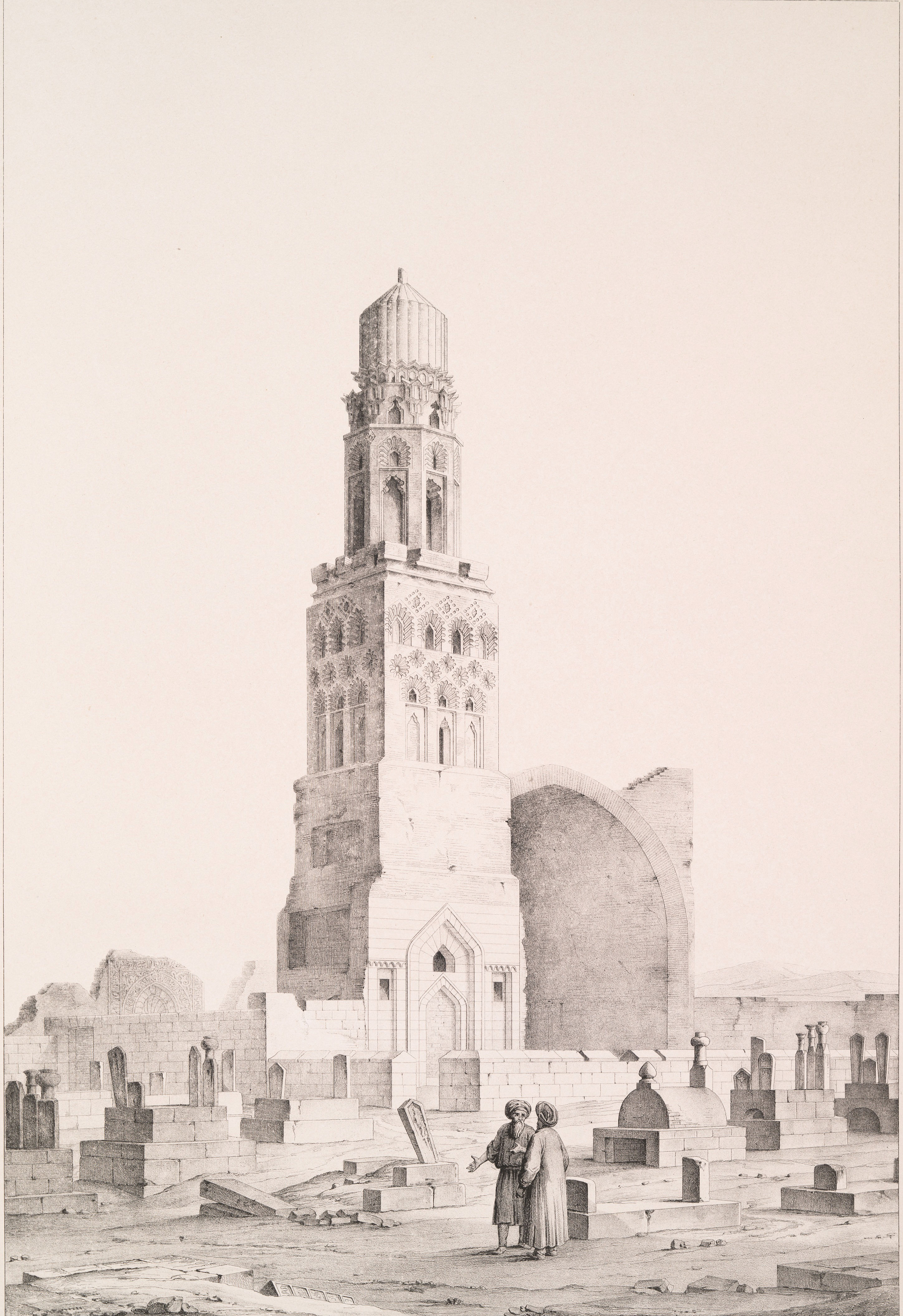
Drawing by Pascal Coste in 1823 showing ruins of a minaret and an iwan (no longer extant), believed to have belonged to the madrasa of Shajar al-Durr's funerary complex

The Mausoleum of Shajar al-Durr was part of a larger complex that included a madrasa, a bathhouse, a palace, and a garden. All but the mausoleum were destroyed by French troops, who occupied the area in the early 19th century. A drawing of the area by Pascal Coste in 1823 depicts a minaret and a large iwan which likely belonged to the complex's madrasa. The minaret in this drawing has strong stylistic resemblance to the minaret of the Salihiyya Madrasa, near the mausoleum that Shajar al-Durr had built for al-Salih. Shajar al-Durr's mausoleum functions to commemorate her memory; unlike other mausoleums, it does not serve to memorialize her lineage or the lineage of the Ayyubid Dynasty since she had no previous family or surviving offspring. Shajar al-Durr's mausoleum also became a place of worship and meeting for women in Cairo much like many other tombs around the city.

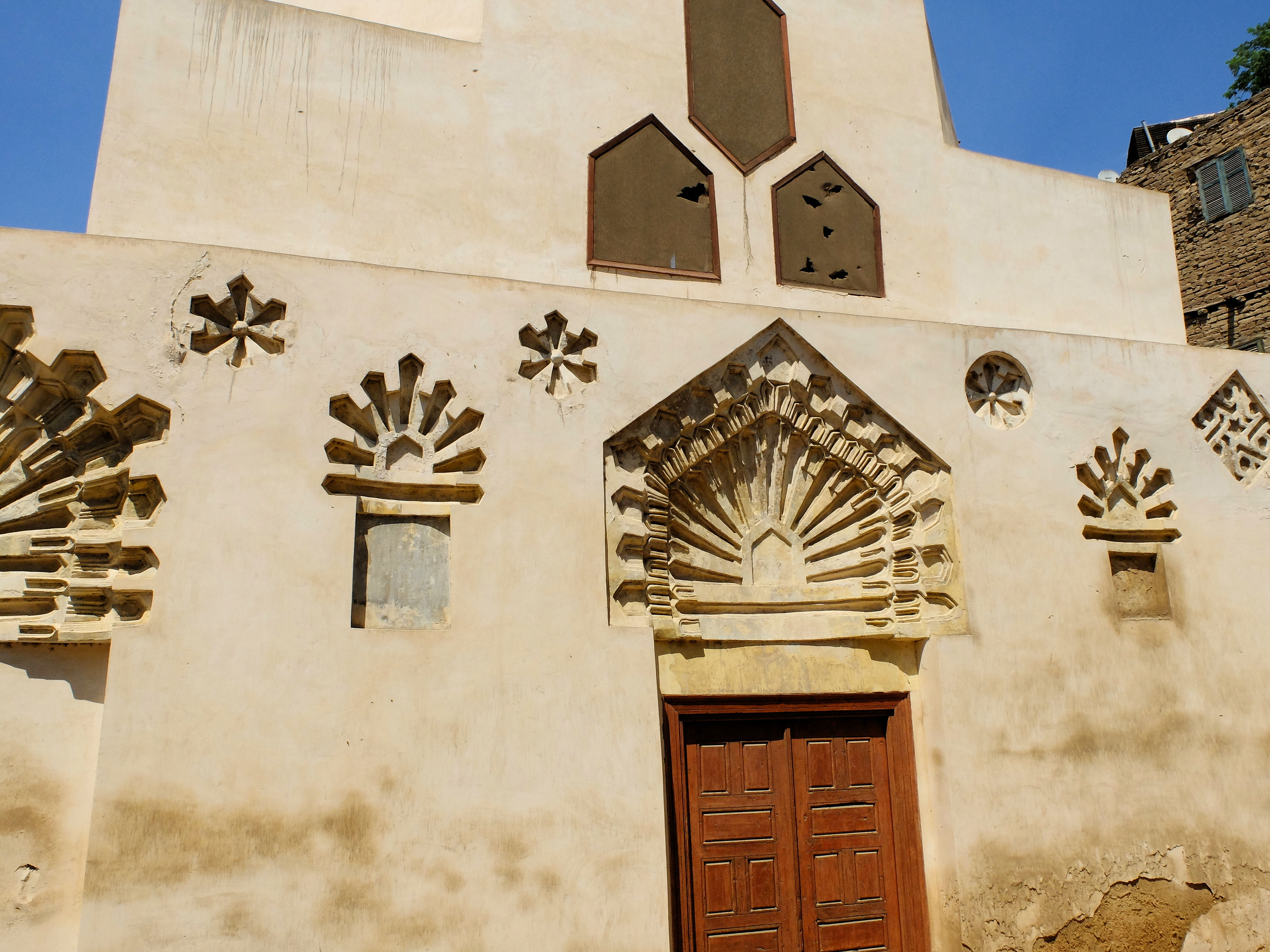
Keel-arch niches decorating the mausoleum's exterior

Three of the mausoleum's walls contain entrances, with the exception of its qibla wall which instead protrudes outward to indicate its significance. Ornamentation on the outside contains several stucco keel-arch niches with scalloped edges, hoods, and fluted lozenges. Above each entrance on the interior, additional keel-arch niches are bordered by two smaller rows of shallower niches with floral motifs, creating a stalactite effect referred to as muqarnas. Among the muqarnas are clusters of three hexagonal windows on each wall, with one window situated directly above two lower windows arranged side-by-side On the interior walls of the mausoleum, unfinished blue and green foliage and arabesque designs were discovered after a recent renovation and can be seen on the stucco squinches supporting the dome above.

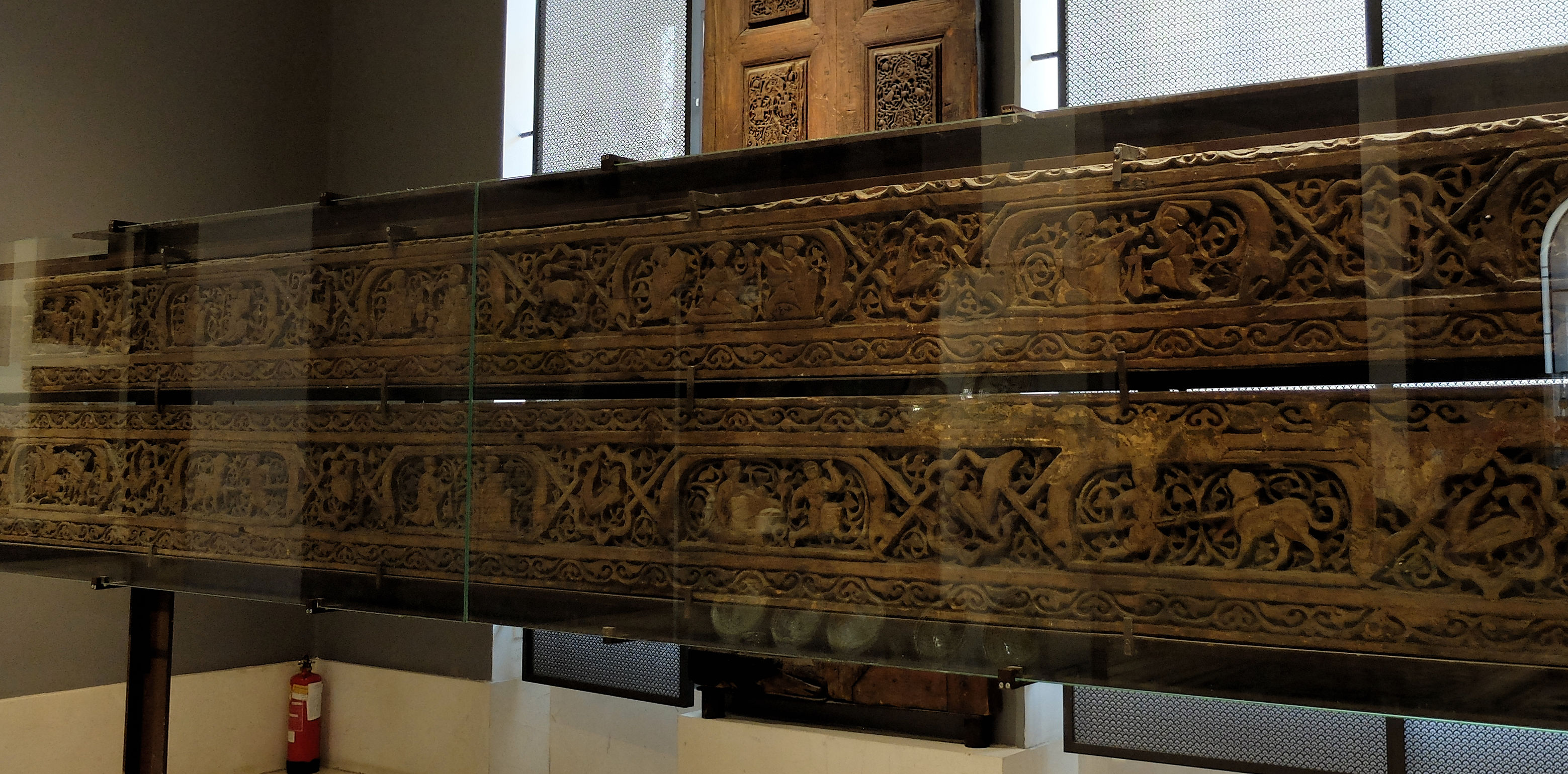
Wooden beams from the Fatimid palaces, similar to the spolia beams in the Mausoleum of Shajar al-Durr

The pointed dome measures 11 meters in diameter, and the square base is 7 meters on each side, united by a highly detailed transition zone. Eight hexagonal windows encircle the bottom of the dome, and two wooden beams run across the mausoleum's four walls. Repurposed by Shajar al-Durr as spolia, the beams were originally created for a Fatimid palace. They contain Fatimid Kufi inscription of the Quran ayah 2:255 in cartouches interspersed with poly-lobed medallions. Following the spolia, there lies another purpose other than material as it functioned as a strong symbol and gesture linking the new rule to legitimacy as well as scale of the caliphal dynasty which had founded Cairo. Additional friezes were made to commemorate her as the mother of Khalil, which plausibly dates the mausoleum before Izz al-Din Aybak's rule.

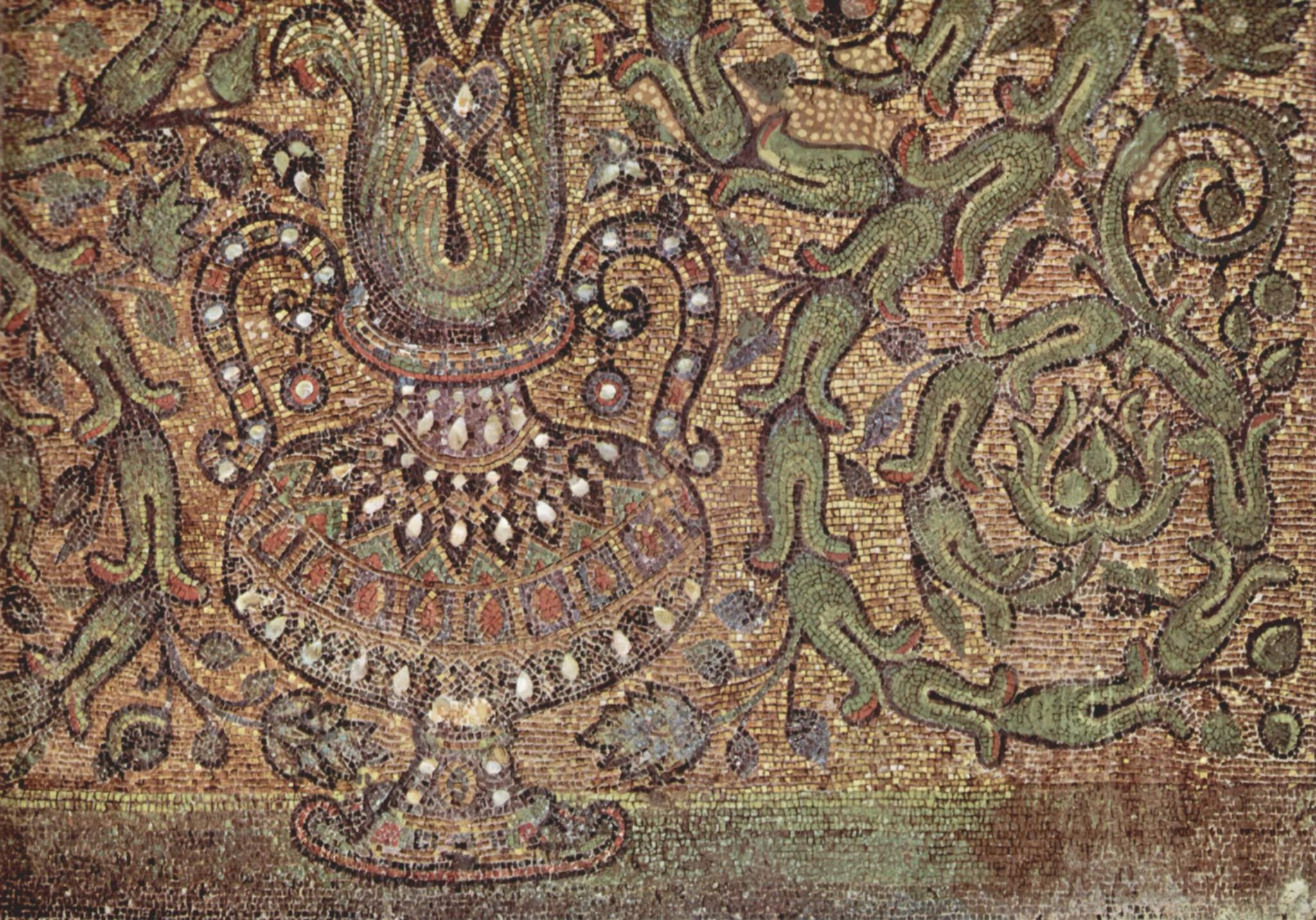
Example of Umayyad-era mosaics in the Dome of the Rock, similar to the mosaic in the mausoleum's mihrab

On the interior, the mihrab is embellished with a concave golden mosaic within a braided border observed on the eastern qibla wall. It contains a swirling arabesque design with gilded tesserae depicting a tree with lotus buds and pearlescent orb-shaped fruits. This display was the first mosaic and use of tesserae in Egypt at the time, showing the multicultural influences employed in Cairo. The inlay is reminiscent of the mosaics in both the Umayyad Great Mosque of Damascus and Dome of the Rock in Jerusalem. Unlike the dark blue and green colors present in mosaics from Damascus and Jerusalem, Shajar al-Durr's architects adopted a simplified color palette for her mausoleum that includes black, green, gold, and red. Additionally, mother of pearl inlays within the mosaic allude to the meaning of her name "Tree of Pearls".

The mausoleum exhibits influence from Syria and incorporates spolia from a Fatimid palace to commemorate Shajar al-Durr's rule as sultan. After acquiring the throne from her late husband al-Salih, she obtained much of his estate and thus utilized funding and other resources to construct her own tomb. While construction of al-Salih's mausoleum was underway, Shajar al-Durr's tomb was also being assembled by the same artisans who created the nearby Mausoleum of the Abbasid Caliphs. This is evident in the high pointed dome, square base, and middle transitional zone speckled with trios of carved-out hexagonal windows. Stucco detailing is seen on the exterior of the building with fluted keel arched niches that reflect the Fatimid-Ayyubid architectural style of this era.

== Contributions to Egyptian architecture ==
Demonstrating continuity between Fatimid and Ayyubid architectural styles, both the madrasa and mosque emphasize Fatimid-derived exterior ornamentation. This included stucco keel-arches, glass mosaics, and carved stone, which left "a lasting legacy" on Cairo and eventually became "a hallmark of Mamluk architecture". One year after his death, in 1250, the remains of Sultan al-Salih were installed within his tomb. Her decision to build his tomb adjacent to the madrasa he commissioned became "an innovation that was followed in the endowed complexes of the Mamluks". This began a trend in Cairo in which the tomb of a patron would be attached to a religious or charitable complex that they had contributed to the city and is seen in the connection of the tomb and his madrasa. One such notable example within Cairo, Egypt being the Madrasa and Friday Mosque of Sultan Hassan that is considered to be a great example of these societally beneficial complexes. The Islamic architectural historian D. Fairchild Ruggles has argued that in doing this, Shajar al-Durr effectively changed the course of Egyptian architecture from then on.

Overall, Shajar al-Durr was able to redefine what purpose a religious complex served in the wider context of the city. Post Shajar al-Durr influence meant that these structures exuded dynastical monumentality through their charitable roles within the community. Mausoleums and Madrasas were integrated, dynastical legitimacy presented itself within the urban architecture, and a lasting legacy for Malmuk patronage was established.

The Mamluk Sultan Qalawun is sometimes credited for introducing golden glass mosaics to Egypt in the 1280s. While some accounts suggest that Qalawun had the mosaics installed in Shajar al-Durr's mausoleum, this is unconfirmed and the mosaics were most likely constructed under al-Durr's patronage.

== Restorations ==
Renovations and research continue on the complex. In 1902 and 1927–1930, the Comité de Conservation des Monuments de l’art Arabe conducted preservation on the mausoleum by recovering its exterior surfaces and removing crumbled fabric. Again in 1990–2006, the Ministry of State for Antiquities preserved its appearance by adding another stucco finish layer to the building. Finally, during the building's 4th restoration headed by Athar Lina and overseen by May al-Ibrashy in 2015 and 2016, restoration efforts uncovered the presence of wall paintings in the transition zone of the mausoleum. These paintings, dated to the same year as the dome's construction in 1251, contained motifs of greenish-blue lotus buds and swirling arabesque in poly-lobed panels.

Al-Ibrashy described the complex as being in a “poor state of preservation” before her team's conservation effort. The mausoleum's interior walls and dome had been covered with cement during recent restoration efforts. Alkaline groundwater had consequently permeated the structure, resulting in water damage and efflorescence. This prompted a meticulous and time-consuming effort to remove most of the concrete with scalpels to avoid further damage to the underlying materials. The restoration team then restored the mausoleum's damaged mortar and stucco elements.

== See also ==
- High medieval domes
