= Siege of Ascalon (1247) =

1247 Engagement between the Crusaders and Ayyubids

Coordinates: 31°39′43″N 34°32′46″E

- Part of the Crusades
Date	August – 15 October 1247
Location	Ascalon
Result	Ayyubid victory

Belligerents
Ayyubid dynasty	Knights Hospitaller; Reinforcements; Kingdom of Jerusalem; Kingdom of Cyprus

Commanders and leaders
as-Salih Ayyub	Castellan

Strength
Unknown	100 knights(in garrison or relief force)

The siege of Ascalon was launched by the Ayyubid sultan as-Salih Ayyub against the Hospitaller garrison of Ascalon, resulting in the Ayyubids taking control of Ascalon.

== Background ==
Shortly after the Barons' Crusade of Theobald I of Navarre, Ascalon's walls were repaired, and after the Battle of Forbie, some of the crusaders escaped to Ascalon. Shortly after a civil war between as-Salih Ayyub and al-Salih Ismail, which ended in Ayyub's victory and the consolidation of Damascus under his control, Ayyub now gave his attention to the Crusaders. On June 17, 1247, Tiberias was captured, and soon afterwards, Mount Tabor and Belvoir fell to the Ayyubids. The Muslims then marched towards Ascalon.

== Siege ==
The Ascalon fortifications were in good position and had a strong garrison of knights Hospitallers. The Hospitallers called for aid from Cyprus and Acre. Henry I of Cyprus sent a fleet of 8 galleys and 100 knights and went to Acre, where they joined the navy assembled at Acre and headed towards Ascalon. The Ayyubid assembled a fleet of 21 galleys who were blockading Ascalon, sailed to meet the Crusader navy, but before any engagement happens, a storm ran into the fleet and wrecked many of the Muslim ships. The survivors sailed back to Egypt.

The Crusader navy managed to reach Ascalon unharmed and supply the garrison with men and food. However, the bad weather forced the Crusader navy to set sail for Acre, leaving Ascalon to its fate. The Ayyubids had no siege equipment, but the wreckage of their fleet provided them with wood to construct siege weapons. They built a battering ram and forced its way to the walls. On October 15, they managed to enter the castle using a tunnel. The Crusaders were taken by surprise. The majority of the crusaders were killed, and the rest were taken prisoners.

== Aftermath ==
Ayyub ordered Ascalon to be demolished and left desolate. Ayyub chose not to follow up with his victory. He went to Jerusalem, repaired its walls, and headed to Damascus to spend the winter there.

== Sources ==
- Fulton, Michael S. (2018). Artillery in the Era of the Crusades: Siege Warfare and the Development of Trebuchet Technology. BRILL. ISBN 9789004376922.
- Hill, George (2010). A History of Cyprus, Volume 2. Cambridge University Press. ISBN 9781108020633.
- Jaques, Tony (2006). Dictionary of Battles and Sieges, A Guide to 8,500 Battles from Antiquity Through the Twenty-first Century [3 Volumes]. Bloomsbury Publishing USA. ISBN 9780313027994.
- Runciman, Steven (1954). A History Of The Crusades Vol-III. Penguin Book.
