= Saʿd al-Din al-Humaidi =

Ayyubid emir of Baalbek (c. 1246)

- Other names: al-Humaydi
- Citizenship: Ayyubid Empire
- Occupation: Ayyubid governor of Baalbek
- Era: 13th century
- Title: Governor
- Predecessor: as-Salih Ismail

Saʿd al-Din al-Humaidi or al-Humaydi was a 13th-century Kurdish Ayyubid governor of Baalbek. He was appointed by as-Salih Ayyub after the 1246 conquest of the territory following a year-long siege after the death of its former lord, as-Salih Ismail.
