= Salihiyya Madrasa =

Medieval center of Islamic learning in Cairo, Egypt

- المدرسة الصالحية - مدرسة وقبة نجم الدين أيوب (Arabic)
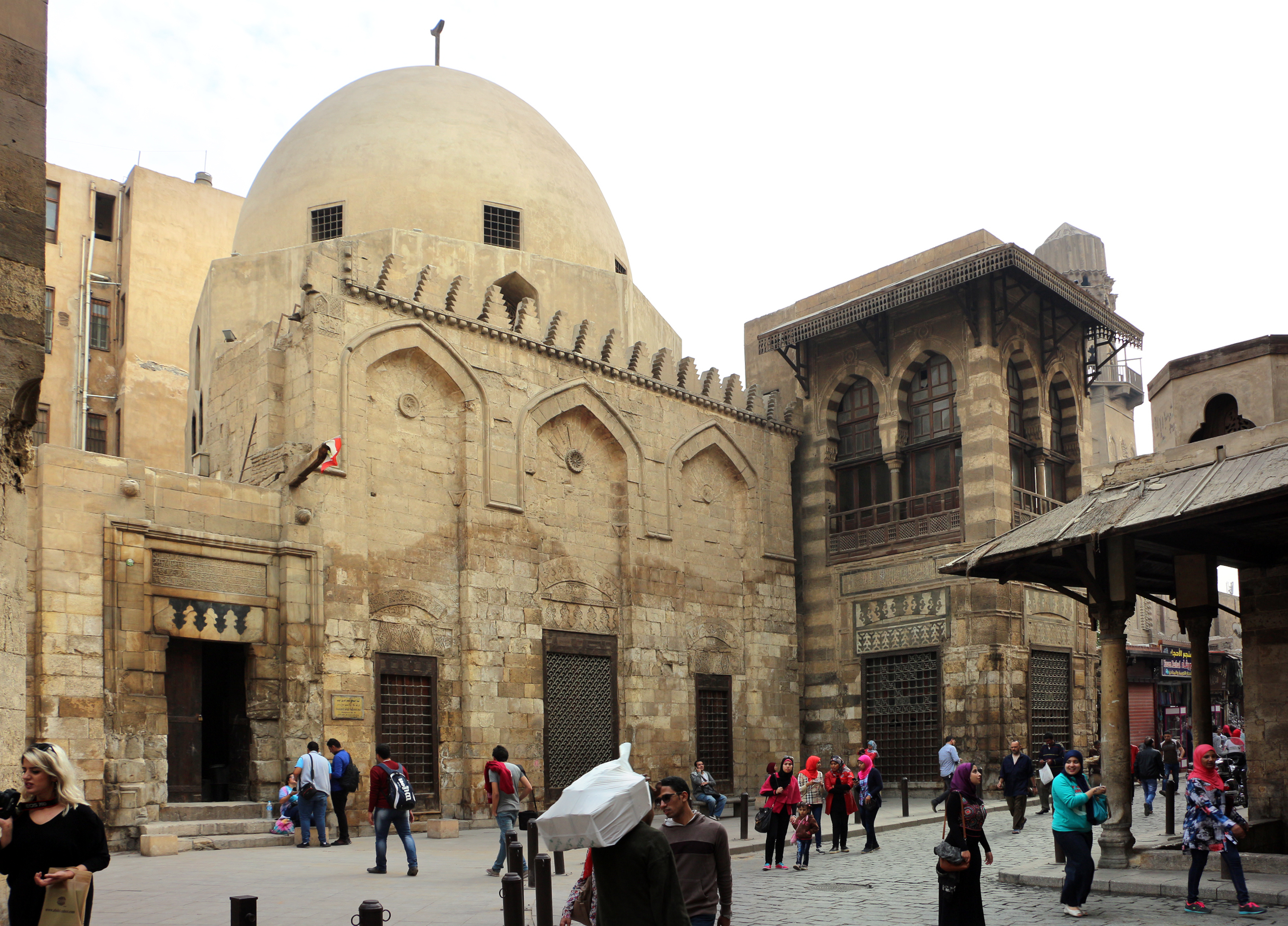
- The domed Mausoleum of as-Salih Najm ad-Din Ayyub, overlooking al-Muizz street today
- Interactive map of Salihiyya Madrasa
- 30°2′56.9″N 31°15′40.8″E
- Location: Cairo, Egypt

History
- Founder: Sultan As-Salih Ayyub
- Built: 1242-1249
- Built for: Sultan As-Salih Ayyub (his tomb)
- Original use: madrasa, mausoleum

Site notes
- Architectural styles: Ayyubid, Islamic
- Current use: museum

The Salihiyya Madrasa (or Madrasa as-Salihiyya), also called the Madrasa and Mausoleum of as-Salih Najm ad-Din Ayyub (Arabic: مدرسة وقبة الصالح نجم الدين أيوب, romanized: Madrasa wa Qubbat as-Salih Nagm ad-Din Ayyub) is a historic madrasa and mausoleum complex in Cairo, Egypt. The complex was founded by the Ayyubid sultan As-Salih Ayyub in 1242 and his mausoleum was added to it by Shajarr ad-Durr upon his death in 1249. It was one of the most prominent centers of Islamic learning in the Ayyubid and Mamluk era in the 13th–14th centuries CE. Its remains are located on al-Muizz Street in the historic district of Cairo across from the Complex of Sultan Qalawun.

== History ==
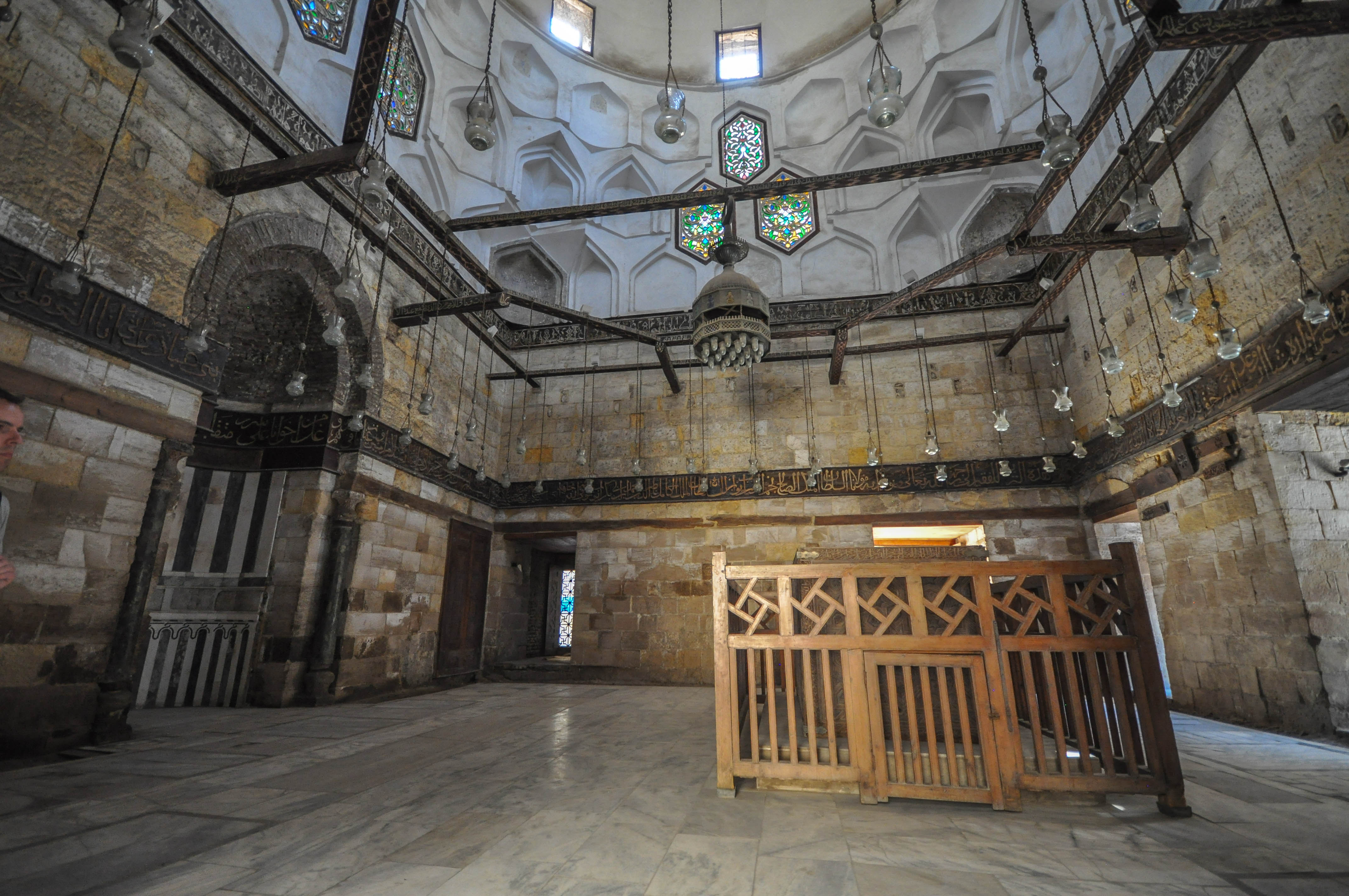
Interior of the mausoleum

In the 13th century, the Ayyubid dynasty founded by Saladin ruled Egypt and the neighboring lands. In 1242, the sultan at the time, as-Salih Ayyub, built the Salihiyya Madrasa (named after him). It became the first madrasa ("religious college") in Cairo to teach all four of Sunni Islam's madhabs ("schools of law"). The northern wing of the complex was dedicated to the Shafi'i and Maliki denominations and the southern wing was dedicated to the Hanafi and Hanbali denominations.

In 1249, Shajar al-Durr, as-Salih Ayyub's widow, had a mausoleum for as-Salih built adjacent to his madrasa. This established a medieval Islamic tradition of burying the patron in the religious institution he or she founded. The Salihiyya Madrasa trained Sunni faqih (judges or experts in jurisprudence) and soon became known as the "citadel of the scholars (ulema)." Historical accounts such as the map of al-Maqrizi show that there were 24 madrasas in the Ayyub Cairo. However, most of these madrasas except the Madrasa of Al-Saleh and Madrasa al-Kamil have not survived. Even a large part of the Madrasa of as-Salih has disappeared, except for a part of western iwan. It was deserted sometime following the conquest of Egypt by the Ottoman Empire in the early 16th century.

== Architecture ==
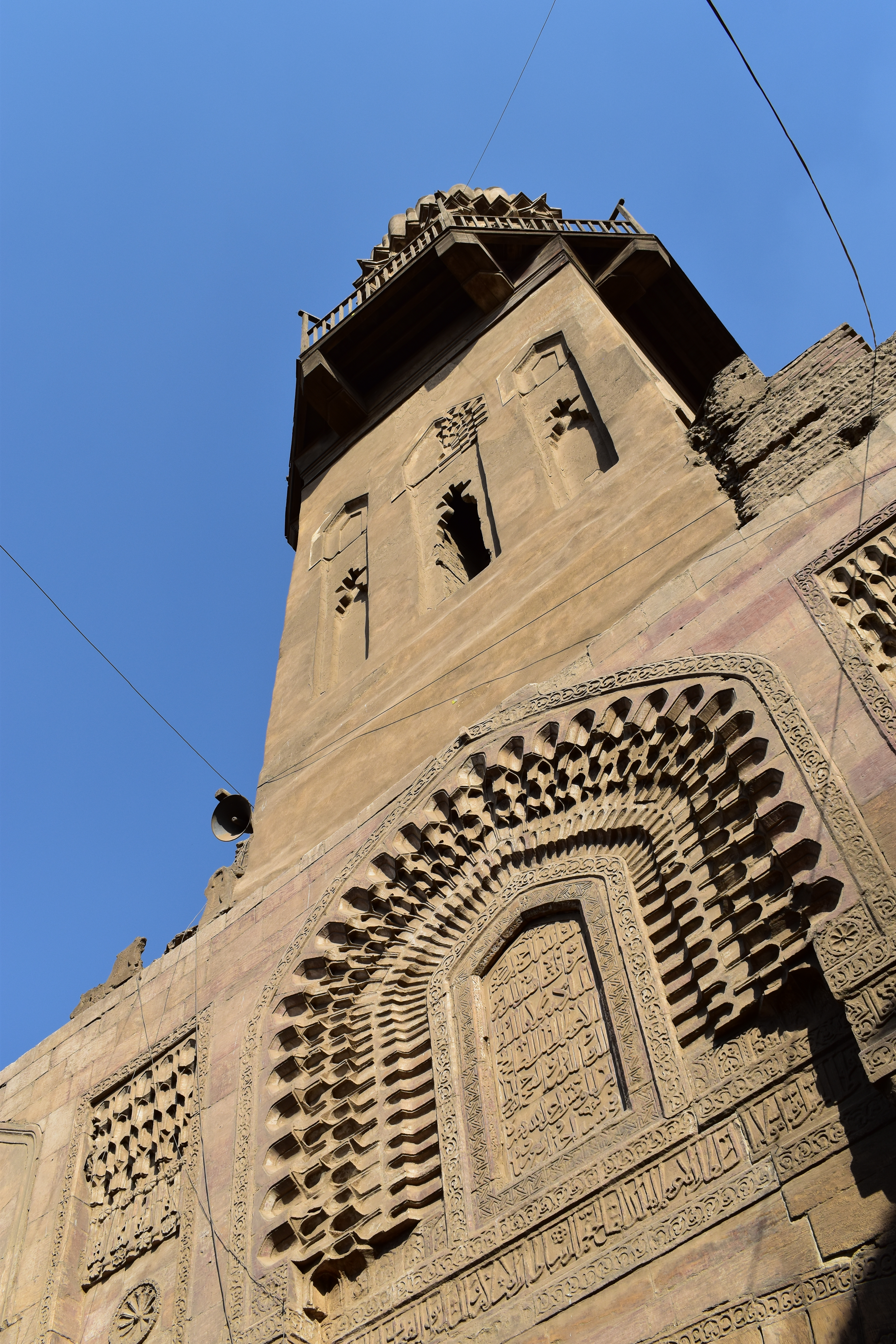
Minaret of al-Salih Ayyub's madrasa (western side or outer facade)

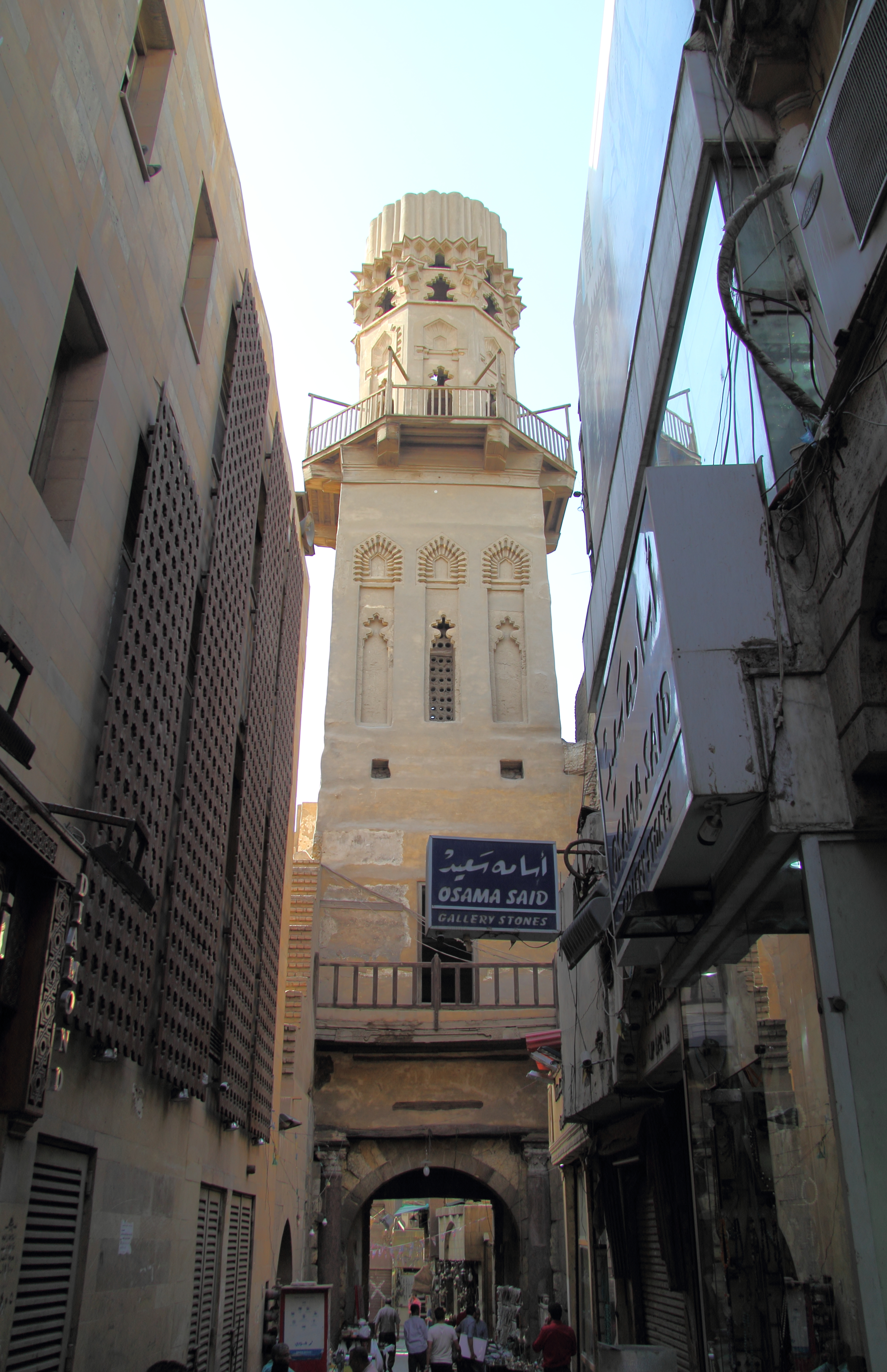
Minaret of al-Salih Ayyub's madrasa (eastern side)

According to Muslim chronicler al-Maqrizi, as-Salih Ayyub had the eastern wall of the royal palace demolished in order to construct the two building complexes that made up the Salihiyya Madrasa. The two parallel wings were divided by a public passageway. Each of the wings consisted of two floors centered on open inner courts. The western portion of each wing provided student housing while the eastern halves functioned as iwans—open vaulted halls where teaching took place. The architectural plan originated in Islamic Persia, while the iwans themselves derive from pre-Islamic Persia. Although the Salihiyya Madrasa was not the first madrasa to introduce the iwan court to Egypt, it is the oldest surviving structure of its type in the country. Its plan played a significant role in Cairo's later architecture.

Today, there are no remains of the southern wing except for the facade. Few parts of the northern wing, namely the iwan, still stand. This iwan was dedicated to the Maliki denomination. The larger qibla iwan which is no longer intact had three mihrabs and was dedicated to Shafi'i denomination. Because of the issue of reconciling already-built thoroughfares with the traditional need to align the primary structures with Mecca, the building plan was asymmetrical. The building's exterior is currently covered by shops, with only the minaret and parts of the central facade visible from the street.

The Salihiyya Madrasa broke the Ayyubid tradition of only adding minarets to Friday mosques to call Muslims to prayer in that mosque. The madrasa's minaret is positioned directly over the entrance of the madrasa. The structure has two shafts topped by ribbed helmet domes divided by a balcony and is known as a mabkhara ("incense burner.") The lower shaft is rectangular and on each of its sides are three tall, recessed, keel-arched panels with ribbed hoods. Its upper shaft is octagonal in shape and also with keel-arched panels. Unlike its lower counterpart, however, it is a more open structure filled with lobe-arched windows. The bases of the minaret's domes are decorated by two bands of muqarnas.

== See also ==
- Al-Azhar Mosque
- High medieval domes

== Bibliography ==
- Daly, M. W.; Petry, Carl F. (1998), The Cambridge History of Egypt: Islamic Egypt, 640–1517, Cambridge University Press, ISBN 978-0-521-47137-4
- Yeomans, Richard (2006), The art and architecture of Islamic Cairo, Garnet & Ithaca Press, ISBN 978-1-85964-154-5
