= D. Fairchild Ruggles =

American historian

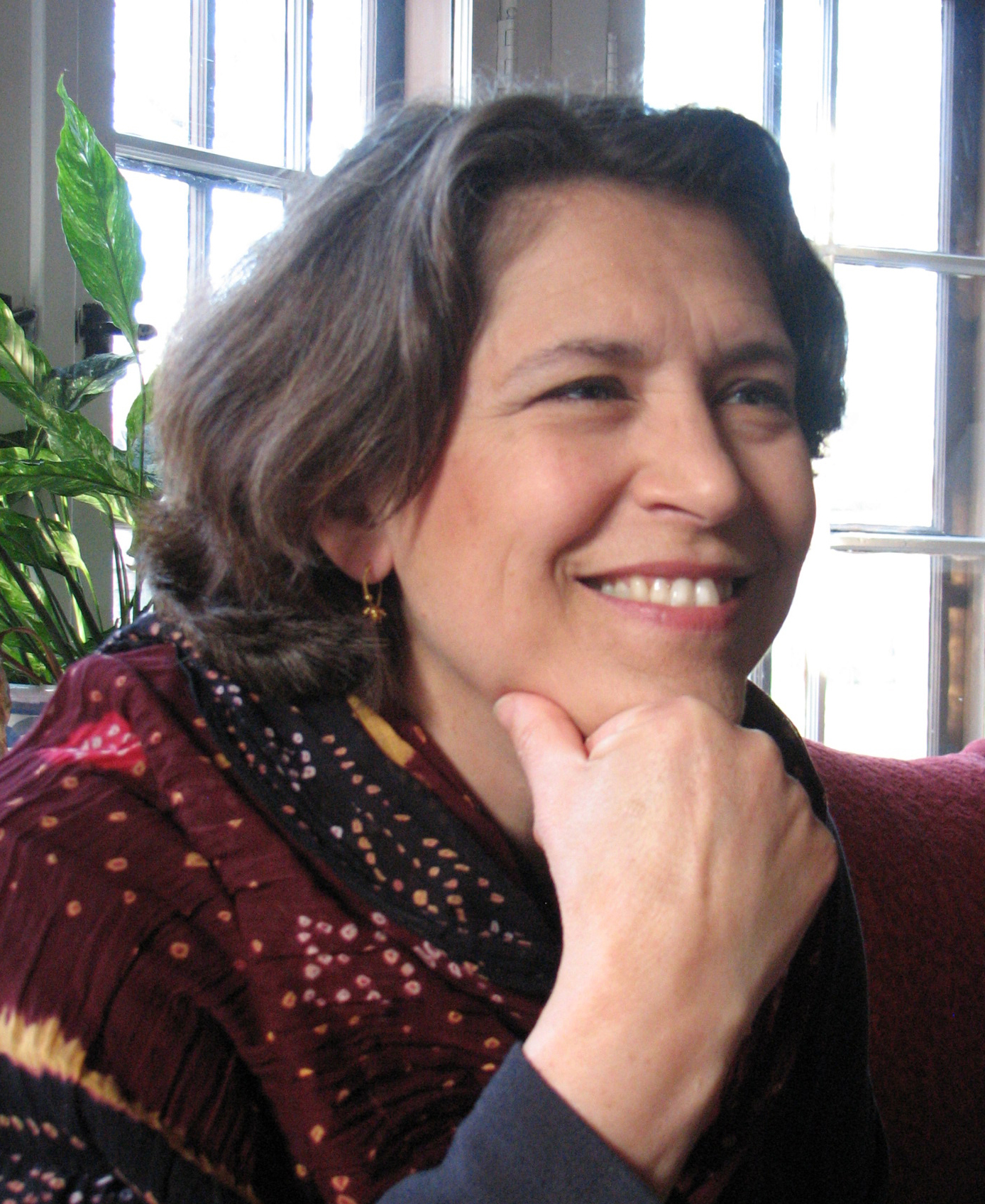
- In 2013
- Occupation: Historian of Islamic art
- Years active: 2000–present
- Notable work: Gardens, Landscape, and Vision in the Palaces of Islamic Spain

D. (Dede) Fairchild Ruggles is an American historian of Islamic art and architecture, and a professor in the University of Illinois Department of Landscape Architecture. She is known for her books on Islamic gardens and landscapes, her series of edited volumes on cultural heritage, and her award-winning work in gender history.

At the University of Illinois at Urbana-Champaign, Professor Ruggles holds the Presidential Chair in Humanities and Social Science.

== Biography ==
D. Fairchild Ruggles gained her bachelor's degree cum laude in Visual and Environmental Studies at Harvard University. She gained her master's degree and doctorate in History of Art at the University of Pennsylvania. She held teaching posts at Cornell, Harvard, Binghamton University, and Ithaca College. In 2000, she went to the University of Illinois, Urbana-Champaign as a tenured associate professor; she became full Professor in 2007. She held the Debra Mitchell Chair in Landscape Architecture beginning in 2018, followed by the Presidential Chair in Humanities and Social Science since 2023, with additional appointments in Art History, Architecture, Spanish & Portuguese, and Gender & Women's Studies.

At the university, she serves as Director of the Unit for Criticism and Interpretive Theory, an interdisciplinary program that, since its founding in 1981, has advanced the study of theory and shaped major debates about poststructuralism, Marxism, cultural studies, feminism, and postcolonial theory.

Ruggles has written on a wide range of topics. She has served as the Art and Architecture Field Editor for the Encyclopaedia of Islam since 2016. She is known for her studies of the landscapes and gardens of the Islamic world and its diasporas, including those in South Asia and the Islamic Golden Age of al-Andalus. Her books have been translated into at least 9 languages.

== Scholarship ==
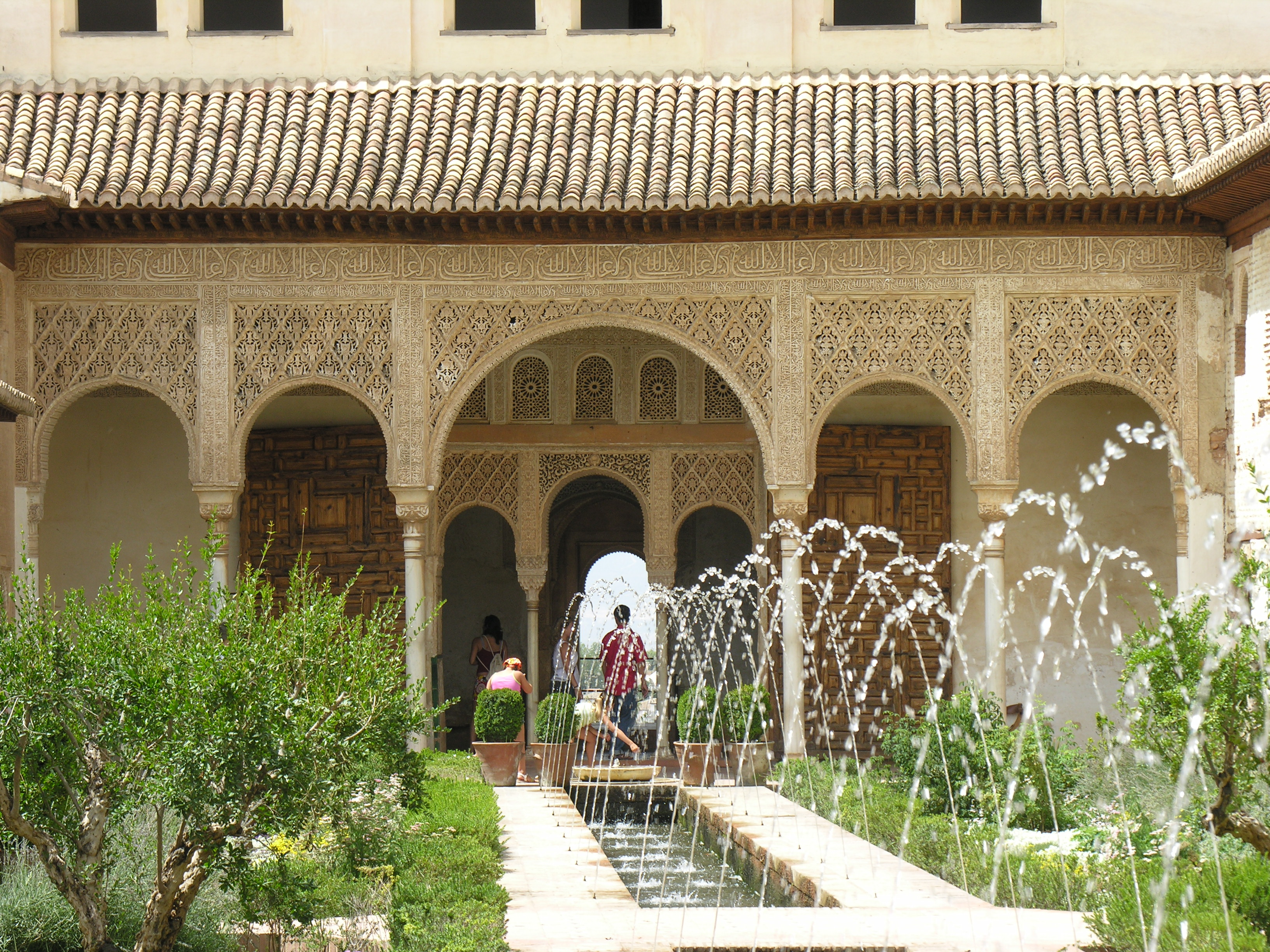
Ruggles studies the landscapes and gardens of the Islamic Golden Age of Al-Andalus.

Just as Islamic culture is historically complex, so too is the history of its landscapes. Ruggles traces the earliest Islamic gardens to the need to organize the surrounding space of human civilization, tame nature, enhance the earth's yield, and create a legible map for the distribution of agricultural and natural resources. Cautioning against the too-easy simplification of Islamic gardens as having a single meaning or reflecting a single identity, she has described these gardens as "expressions of memory, place-making, humankind's position in the great cosmos, the imagination, rationality, political power, and the yearning for eternity."

Ruggles is also a scholar of gender. In her introduction to Women, Patronage, and Self-Representation in Islamic Societies (2000), she queried modern conceptions of agency, asking what forms of power were held by Muslim women in the 8th through 19th centuries.

== Awards and distinctions ==
- 2000: Eleanor Tufts Book Award from the American Society for Hispanic Art Historical Studies for Gardens, Landscape, and Vision in the Palaces of Islamic Spain
- 2009: J. B. Jackson Book Prize from the Foundation for Landscape Studies for Islamic Gardens and Landscapes
- 2009: Allen G. Noble Book Award from the International Society for Landscape, Place, & Material Culture for Sites Unseen: Landscape and Vision (with co-author Dianne Harris)
- 2021: Nancy Lapp Popular Book Award from the American Society for Overseas Research for Tree of Pearls
- 2026: Elected a Fellow of the Medieval Academy of America

Distinctions include National Endowment for the Humanities fellowships, appointment to the NEH Muslim Bookshelf project with the American Library Association, and a grant to co-direct an NEH Summer Institute in Granada, Spain; a fellowship from the American Council for Learned Societies; a fellowship from the Getty Grant Program and appointment to co-direct a multi-year project "Mediterranean Palimpsests"; fellowships from the Center for Advanced Study in the Visual Arts (CASVA) at the National Gallery of Art; a residency at Shangri La from the Doris Duke Foundation; and an appointment as Visiting Scholar at Dumbarton Oaks.

== Reception ==
=== Gardens, Landscape, and Vision in the Palaces of Islamic Spain ===
Shirine Hamadeh, in Review of Middle East Studies, called the book a "compelling study of seven centuries of Islamic garden and landscape tradition in the Iberian peninsula". She writes that Ruggles assembles a wide variety of types of evidence – archaeology, history, poetry, agricultural writings, and paintings – to show that a new "landscape vocabulary" was created at Madinat al-Zahra, Cordoba, in the tenth century, and that this spread across al-Andalus until it reached its zenith at the Alhambra palace.

Maria Rosa Menocal, in The Medieval Review, wrote that "Ruggles's always clear narrative interweaves all the fundamental threads of the historical and political events necessary to fully appreciate the cultural bases of everything that had to do with that dramatic transformation of the Iberian landscape. She seems as at home talking about the changing yields of crop harvests as about the variations in the concepts of paradise as a garden across different cultures." The book was reviewed in The Burlington Magazine in 2001.

=== Islamic Gardens and Landscapes ===
The Foundation for Landscape Studies wrote that "Ruggles uses poetry, court documents, agronomy manuals, and early garden representations to immerse the reader in the world of the architects of the great gardens of the Islamic world, from medieval Morocco to contemporary India. Western admirers have long seen the Islamic garden as an earthly reflection of the paradise said to await the faithful. Such simplification, Ruggles contends, denies the sophistication and diversity of the art form. Just as Islamic culture is historically dense, sophisticated, and complex, so too is the history of its built landscapes. She follows the evolution of early Islamic agricultural efforts to their aristocratic apex in the formal gardens of the Alhambra in Spain and the Taj Mahal in Agra."

=== Tree of Pearls ===
Elizabeth Urban, reviewing the book in the American Journal of Islam and Society, notes that Shajar al-Durr, Arabic for "Tree of Pearls", was a rare example of a female Sultan, distinguished further by having been a slave. Urban comments that Ruggles emphasizes al-Durr's effect on Islamic architecture through her patronage of new buildings in Cairo. Urban calls Ruggles's description of al-Durr's rise to power "a gripping account". She writes that Ruggles makes the suggestion that since al-Durr could not present herself publicly, "she instead used ... public architecture to create larger-than-life, self-aggrandizing monuments to both herself and her husband." In her view, Tree of Pearls "is a lucid introduction to Shajar al-Durr’s career and especially her mastery of the symbolic language of public architecture."

== Works ==
=== Written ===
- (2000) Gardens, Landscape, and Vision in the Palaces of Islamic Spain
- (2008) Islamic Gardens and Landscapes
- (2014) co-authored with Henry Kim, Ruba Kana’an, and Philip Jodidio. The Aga Khan Museum Guide; republished as Pattern and Light: Aga Khan Museum; French edition: Forme et Lumière. Le Musée Aga Khan
- (2020) Tree of Pearls: The Extraordinary Architectural Patronage of the 13th-Century Egyptian Slave-Queen Shajar al-Durr
- (2025) Islamicate Environments: Water, Land, Plants, and Society

=== Edited ===
- (2000) Women, Patronage, and Self-Representation in Islamic Societies
- (2007) Sites Unseen: Landscape and Vision (with Diane Harris)
- (2007) Cultural Heritage and Human Rights (with Helaine Silverman)
- (2009) Intangible Heritage Embodied (with Helaine Silverman)
- (2011) Islamic Art and Visual Culture: An Anthology of Sources
- (2012) On Location
- (2014) Woman's Eye, Woman's Hand: Making Art and Architecture in Modern India
- (2017) Sound and Scent in the Garden

=== Films and media ===
==== Writer / Presenter ====
- Writer and presenter of seven short films—Calligraphy, Mosques and Religious Architecture, Islamic Textiles, The Arts of Trade and Travel, Islamic Gardens, Geometry, and The Arts of the Book and Miniature Painting—for the Muslim Journeys Bookshelf project of the National Endowment for the Humanities in association with the American Library Association. Produced by Jeff Weihe, Twin Cities Public Television, 2013

==== Appearances ====
- Filmed interview for one-hour documentary film Ancient Builders: Alhambra, RMC Productions (French television), to be aired in France in 2021.
- Filmed interview and consultant for two-hour documentary, Ornament of the World, directed by Michael Schwartz, Kikim Media, screened at the 2019 Madrid Film festival and broadcast on PBS in 2019
- Filmed interview and consultant for the two-hour documentary film, Islamic Art: Mirror of the Invisible World, Unity Productions and Gardner Films, premiered at Kennedy Center, Washington DC, 2011; broadcast on PBS in 2012
- Filmed interview for television documentary Ancient Megastructures: The Alhambra, National Geographic, broadcast 2009
- Filmed interview for Perspectives on Faith, Ebru cable television, Turkey/US, broadcast 2008
- Filmed interview for the two-hour documentary film, Cities of Light: The Rise and Fall of Islamic Spain, Unity Productions and Gardner Films, broadcast on PBS in 2007
- Radio interview, BBC, Four Corners, April 1, 2002.
- Audio interview, National Geographic, Tale of Three Cities, 196/2 (August, 1999).
