= Shajar al-Durr =

Ayyubid sultan of Egypt in 1250

Shajar al-Durr شجر الدر
- Sultana of Egypt
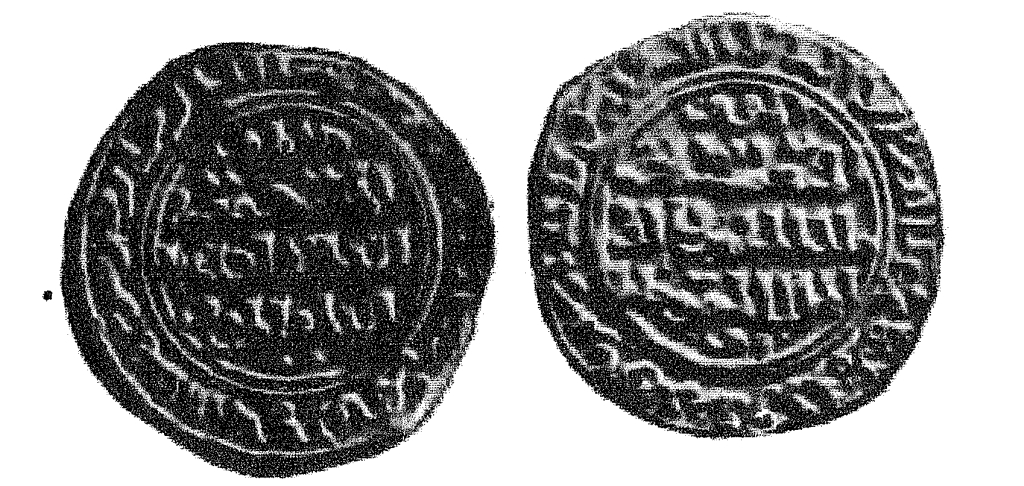
- Dinar coin of Shajar al-Durr

Sultan of Egypt
- Reign: 2 May – 30 July 1250
- Predecessor: Al-Muazzam Turanshah
- Successor: Izz al-Din Aybak

Regent of Egypt
- Regency: 21 November 1249 – 27 February 1250
- Born: c. 1220
- Died: 28 April 1257; Cairo
- Burial: Cairo
- Spouse: As-Salih Ayyub (died 1249) Izz al-Din Aybak (m. 1250; died 1257)
- Issue: Khalil
Names
- al-Malika ʿAṣmat ad-Dīn ʾUmm-Khalīl Shajar ad-Durr
- Religion: Sunni Islam (converted)

Shajar al-Durr (Arabic: شجر الدر, lit. 'Tree of Pearls'), also Shajarat al-Durr (شجرة الدر), (Note: Her coins carried the name Shajarat al-Durr. See below.) whose royal name was al-Malika ʿAṣmat ad-Dīn ʾUmm-Khalīl Shajar ad-Durr (الملكة عصمة الدين أم خليل شجر الدر; (Note: From her nickname أم خليل ʾUmm Khalīl, 'mother of Khalil'. Also Wālidat Khalīl (والدة خليل), with the same meaning. Khalil was her dead son from Sultan as-Salih Ayyub. The names were used by Shajar al-Durr to legitimate and consolidate her position as an heir and ruler. She signed the official documents and sultanic decrees with the name Wālidat Khalīl.) died 28 April 1257), was a ruler of Egypt. She was of Turkic origin. She was the wife of As-Salih Ayyub, and later of Izz al-Din Aybak, the first sultan of the Mamluk Bahri dynasty. Prior to becoming Ayyub's wife, she was a child slave and Ayyub's concubine.

In political affairs, Shajar al-Durr played a crucial role after the death of her first husband during the Seventh Crusade against Egypt (1249–1250 AD). She became the sultana of Egypt on 2 May 1250, marking the end of the Ayyubid reign and the start of the Mamluk era.

== Title ==
Several sources assert that Shajar al-Durr took the title of sultana (سلطانة sulṭānah), the feminine form of sultan. However, in the historical sources (notably Ibn Wasil) and on Shajar al-Durr's only extant coin, she is named as sultan.

== Early life ==
=== Background ===
Like many of the "slave-aristocracy" at the time (such as the mamluks), Shajar al-Durr was likely of Turkic or Armenian origin, and described by historians as a beautiful, pious, and intelligent woman. She was purchased as a slave by As-Salih Ayyub in the Levant before he became a Sultan and accompanied him and Mamluk Rukn al-Din Baybars al-Salihi (not the Baibars who became a Sultan) to Al Karak during his detention there in 1239. Later when As-Salih Ayyub became a Sultan in 1240 she went with him to Egypt and gave birth to their son Khalil who was called al-Malik al-Mansour. Some time after the birth, As-Salih Ayyub married her.

In April 1249, As-Salih Ayyub, who was gravely sick in Syria, returned to Egypt and went to Ashmum-Tanah, near Damietta after he heard that King Louis IX of France had assembled a crusader army in Cyprus and was about to launch an attack against Egypt. In June 1249, the crusaders landed in the abandoned town of Damietta, at the mouth of the river Nile. As-Salih Ayyub was carried on a stretcher to his palace in the better-protected town of Al Mansurah where he died on 22 November 1249 after ruling Egypt for nearly 10 years. Shajar al-Durr informed Emir Fakhr ad-Din ibn as-Shaikh (commander of all the Egyptian army) and Tawashi Jamal ad-Din Muhsin (the chief eunuch who controlled the palace) of the Sultan's death but as the country was under attack by the crusaders they decided to conceal his death. The coffined body of the Sultan was transported in secret by boat to the castle on al-Rudah island in the Nile. Although the deceased Sultan had not left any testimony concerning who should succeed him after his death, Faris ad-Din Aktai was sent to Hasankeyf to call al-Muazzam Turanshah, the son of the deceased Sultan. The eyewitness observers who were alive and in Egypt at the time of the Sultan's death state that documents were forged by a servant who could copy the Sultan's handwriting. Emir Fakhr ad-Din began issuing decrees and giving Sultanic orders and this small circle of advisors succeeded in convincing the people and the other government officials that the Sultan was only ill rather than dead. Shajar al-Durr continued to have food prepared for the sultan and brought to his tent. High officials, the Sultan's Mamluks and soldiers were ordered – by the will of the "ill" Sultan – to swear an oath of loyalty to the Sultan, his heir Turanshah and the Atabeg Fakhr ad-Din Yussuf.

=== Defeat of the Seventh Crusade ===
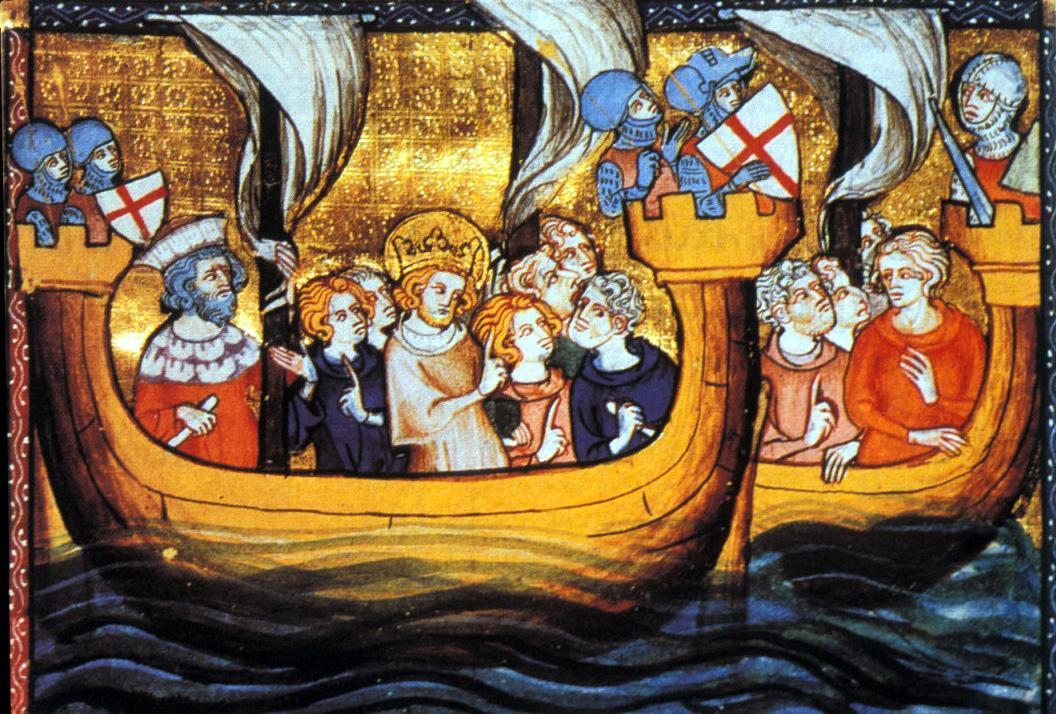
Louis IX on a ship departing from Aigues-Mortes, for the Seventh Crusade

The news of the death of as-Salih Ayyub reached the crusaders in Damietta and with the arrival of reinforcements led by Alphonse, Count of Poitou, the brother of King Louis IX, they decided to march on Cairo. A crusader force led by Louis IX's other brother Robert I of Artois crossed the canal of Ashmum (known today as Albahr Alsaghir) and attacked the Egyptian camp in Gideila, two miles (3 km) from Al Mansurah. Emir Fakhr ad-Din was killed during the sudden attack and the crusader force advanced toward the town of Al Mansurah. Shajar al-Durr agreed to Baibars's plan to defend Al Mansurah. The crusader force was trapped inside the town, Robert of Artois was killed and the crusader force was annihilated by an Egyptian force and the townspeople, led by the men who were about to establish the state which would dominate the southern Mediterranean for decades: Aybak, Qutuz, Baybars and Qalawun.

In February 1250 the dead Sultan's son Al-Muazzam Turanshah arrived in Egypt and was enthroned at Al Salhiyah as he had no time to go to Cairo. With his arrival, Shajar al-Durr announced the death of as-Salih Ayyub. Turanshah went straight to Al Mansurah and on 6 April 1250 the crusaders were entirely defeated at the Battle of Fariskur and King Louis IX was captured.

=== Conflict with Turanshah ===
Once the Seventh Crusade was defeated and Louis IX was captured, troubles began between Turanshah on one side and Shajar al-Durr and the Mamluks on the other. Turanshah, knowing he would not have full sovereignty while Shajar al-Durr, the Mamluks and the old guards of his late father were around, detained a few officials and started to replace old officials, including the deputy Sultan, with his own followers who had come with him from Hasankeyf. He then sent a message to Shajar al-Durr while she was in Jerusalem warning her and requesting her to hand over to him the wealth and jewels of his late father. The request and manners of Turanshah distressed Shajar al-Durr. When she complained to the Mamluks about Turanshah's threats and ungratefulness, the Mamluks, particularly their leader Faris ad-Din Aktai, were enraged. In addition, Turanshah used to drink alcohol and when drunk he abused the bondmaids of his father and threatened the Mamluks. Turanshah was assassinated by Baibars and a group of Mamluk soldiers at Fariskur on 2 May 1250. He was the last of the Ayyubid sultans.

== Reign as Sultan ==
=== Rise to power ===
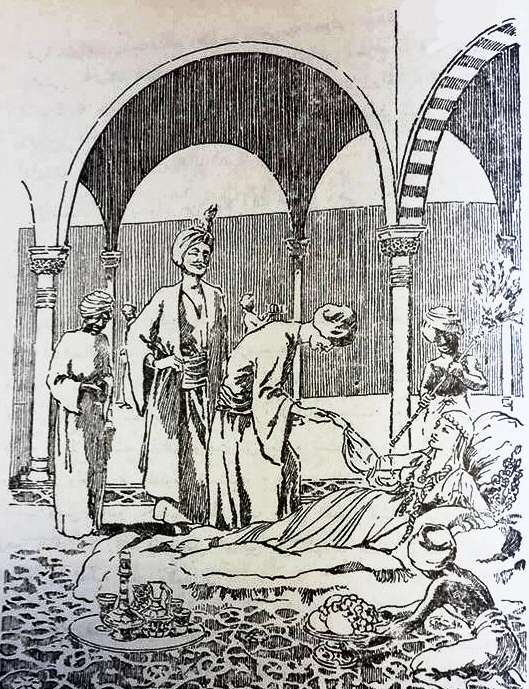
A sketch from 1966 depicting Shajar al-Durr

After the assassination of Turanshah, the Mamluks and emirs met at the Sultanic Dihliz and decided to install Shajar al-Durr as the new monarch with Izz al-Din Aybak as atabeg (commander in chief). Shajar al-Durr was informed of this at the Citadel of the Mountain in Cairo and she agreed. Shajar al-Durr took the royal name "al-Malikah Ismat ad-Din Umm-Khalil Shajar al-Durr" with a few additional titles such as "Malikat al-Muslimin" (Queen of the Muslims) and "Walidat al-Malik al-Mansur Khalil Emir al-Mo'aminin" (Mother of al-Malik al-Mansur Khalil Emir of the faithful). She was mentioned in the Friday prayers in mosques with names including "Umm al-Malik Khalil" (Mother of al-Malik Khalil) and "Sahibat al-Malik as-Salih" (Wife of al-Malik as-Salih). Coins were minted with her titles and she signed the decrees with the name "Walidat Khalil". Using the names of her late husband and her dead son attempted to gain respect and legitimacy for her reign as an heir of the Sultanate.

After paying homage to Shajar al-Durr, Emir Hossam ad-Din was sent to King Louis IX, who was still imprisoned in Al Mansurah, and it was agreed that Louis IX would leave Egypt alive after paying half of the ransom imposed on him earlier and surrendering Damietta in exchange for his life. Louis surrendered Damietta and sailed to Acre On 8 May 1250, accompanied by about 12,000 freed war prisoners.

=== Conflict with the Ayyubids ===
News of the murder of al-Muazzam Turanshah and the inauguration of Shajar al-Durr as the new sultana reached Syria. The Syrian Emirs were asked to pay homage to Shajar al-Durr but they refused and the Sultan's deputy in Al Karak rebelled against Cairo. The Syrian emirs in Damascus gave the city to an-Nasir Yusuf, the Ayyubid emir of Aleppo, and the Mamluks in Cairo responded by arresting the emirs who were loyal to the Ayyubids in Egypt.

In addition to the Ayyubids in Syria, the Abbasid Caliph al-Musta' sim in Baghdad also rejected the Mamluk move in Egypt and refused to recognize Shajar al-Dur as a monarch. Their reason was due to the gender of Shajar al-Durr, and the ruler of Baghdad noted that Islam did not approve of ruling women, stating that Muhammad condemned female rulers with the word: "Woe unto nations governed by women!" The Abbasid Caliph al-Musta' sim sent a message from Baghdad to the Mamluks in Egypt that said: "If you do not have men there tell us so we can send you men."

The refusal of the Caliph to recognize Shajar al-Durr as the new sultana was a great setback to the Mamluks in Egypt as the custom during the Ayyubid era was that the sultan could gain legitimacy only through the recognition of the Abbasid caliph. The Mamluks, therefore, decided to install Izz al-Din Aybak as a new sultan. He married Shajar al-Durr who abdicated and passed the throne to him after she had ruled Egypt as sultana for about three months. Though the period of Shajar al-Durr's rule as a monarch was of short duration, it witnessed two important events in history: one, the expelling of Louis IX from Egypt, which marked the end of the crusaders' ambition to conquer the southern Mediterranean basin; and two, the death of the Ayyubid dynasty and the birth of the Mamluk state which dominated the southern Mediterranean for decades.

== Later life ==
To please the Caliph and secure his recognition, Aybak announced that he was merely a representative of the Abbasid caliph in Baghdad. To placate the Ayyubids in Syria the Mamluks nominated an Ayyubid child named al-Sharaf Musa as a co-sultan. But this did not satisfy the Ayyubids and armed conflicts between the Mamluks and the Ayyubids broke out. The Caliph in Baghdad, preoccupied with the Mongols who were raiding territories not far from his capital, preferred to see the matter settled peacefully between the Mamluks in Egypt and the Ayyubids in Syria. Through negotiation and mediation of the Caliph that followed the bloody conflict, the Mamluks who manifested military superiority reached an agreement with the Ayyubids that gave them control over southern Palestine including Gaza and Jerusalem and the Syrian coast. By this agreement the Mamluks not only added new territories to their dominion but also gained recognition for their new state.

In addition to the conflict with the Ayyubids of Syria, the Mamluks successfully countered serious rebellions in Middle and Upper Egypt. Then, Aybak, fearing the growing power of the Salihiyya Mamluks who, with Shajar al-Durr, had installed him as a sultan, had their leader Faris ad-Din Aktai murdered. The murder of Aktai was followed instantly by a Mamluk exodus to Syria where they joined the Ayyubid an-Nasir Yusuf. Prominent Mamluks like Baibars al-Bunduqdari and Qalawun al-Alfi were among those Mamluks who fled to Syria. Aybak became the sole and absolute ruler of Egypt after the Salihiyya Mamluks who were the supporters of Shajar al-Durr left Egypt and turned against him.

=== Death ===
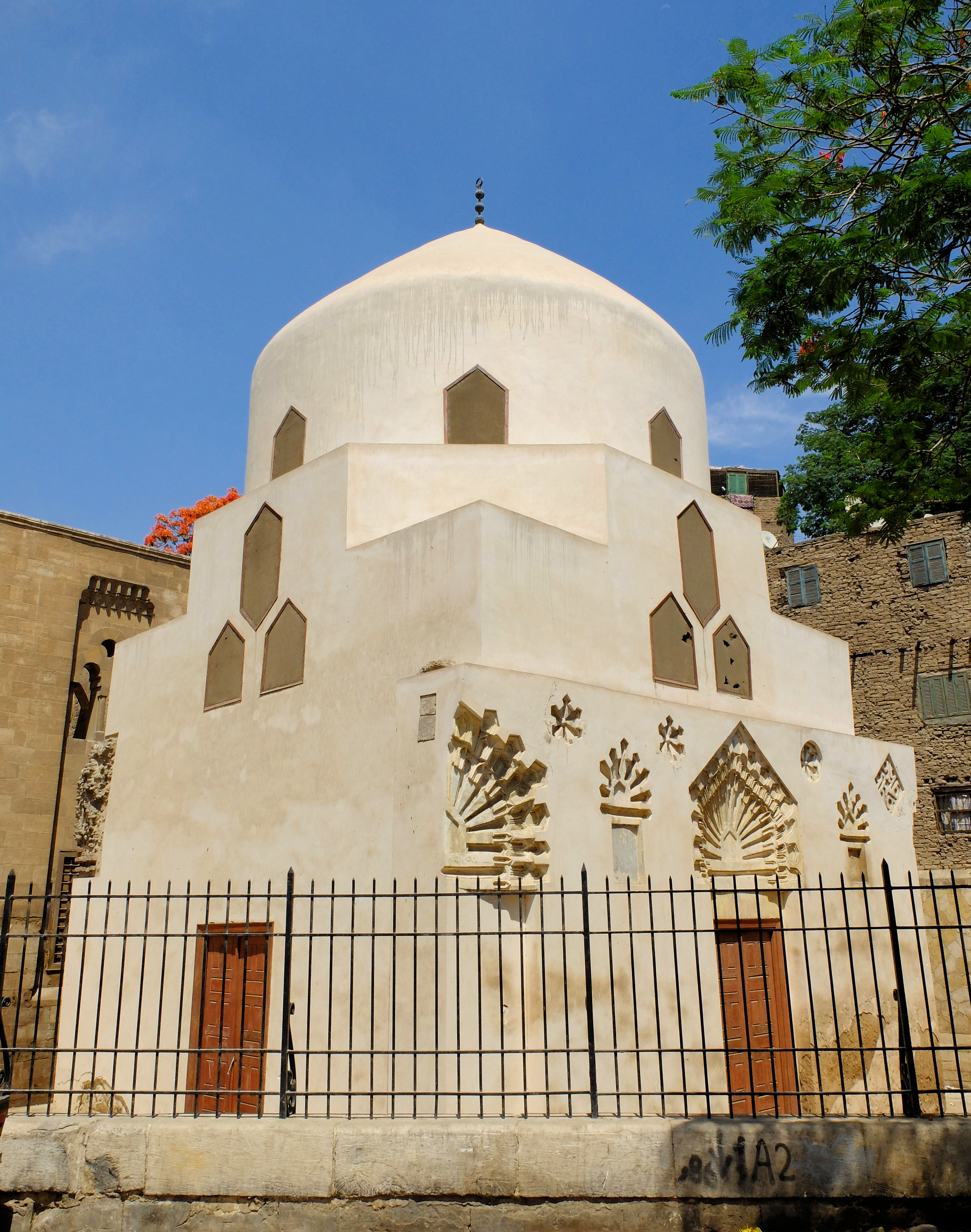
Tomb of Shajar al-Durr

By 1257 disputes and suspicion had become part of the relations between Aybak, a sultan who was searching for security and supremacy, and his wife Shajar al-Durr, a former Sultana who had a strong will and managed a country on edge of collapse during an external invasion. Shajar al-Durr wanted sole rule of Egypt. She concealed Sultanate affairs from Aybak; she also prevented him from seeing his other wife and insisted that he should divorce her. Instead, Aybak, who needed to form an alliance with a strong Emir who could help him against the threat of the Mamluks who had fled to Syria, decided in 1257 to marry the daughter of Badr al-Din Lu'lu' the Ayyubid emir of al-Mosul. Badr al-Din Lu'lu' warned Aybak that Shajar al-Durr was in contact with an-Nasir Yusuf in Damascus. Shajar al-Durr, feeling at risk and betrayed by Aybak, the man whom she had made a sultan, had him murdered by servants while he was taking a bath. He had ruled Egypt for seven years. Shajar al-Durr claimed that Aybak died suddenly during the night but his Mamluks (Mu'iziyya), led by Qutuz, did not believe her and the servants involved confessed under torture. Shajar al-Durr and the servants were arrested and Aybak's Mamluks (the Mu'iziyya Mamluks) wanted to kill her, but the Salihiyya Mamluks protected her and she was taken to the Red Tower where she stayed. The son of Aybak, the 15-year-old al-Mansur Ali, was installed by the Mu'ziyyah Mamluks as the new sultan. On 28 April, Shajar al-Durr was stripped and beaten to death with clogs by the bondmaids of al-Mansur Ali and his mother. According to Egyptian legend, the modern Egyptian dessert known as Umm Ali (Mother of Ali in Arabic) is named after al-Mansur Ali's mother who prepared the dish to celebrate the killing of Shajar. Her naked body was found lying outside the Citadel. According to the historian Ibn Iyas, Shajar al-Durr was dragged from her feet and thrown from the top naked, with a cloth around her waist. She stayed in the moat for three days, unburied, until one night a mob came and took off the cloth around her waist because it was silk with pearls and had a smell of musk. The servants who were involved in the killing of Aybak were executed.

Shajar al-Durr was buried in a tomb, not far from the Mosque of Tulun, which is a jewel of Islamic funerary architecture. Inside is a mihrab (prayer niche) decorated with a mosaic of the "tree of life," executed by artists brought from Constantinople specifically for this commission. The wooden kufic inscription that runs around the interior of her tomb, while damaged, is also of extremely fine craftsmanship.

== Architecture ==
Shajar Al-Durr was well known for adopting the indigenous architecture of Bahri Mamluk tombs and combining them with Madrasas or schools of Islam. She was the first Islamic Sultan of Egypt to use this culturally-syncretized architecture. Her burial structures would continue to be adopted by leaders in the Mamluk Sultanate, which shows that madrasas of Islam were embraced, and they remained in use to the Bahri Mamluks long after Islamic rule.

Shajar al-Durr used her wealth and power to add a tomb to her husband's urban madrasa, the Salihiyya, in 1250, and with this innovation, madrasas and many other charitably endowed architectural complexes became commemorative monuments, a practice that became popular among the Mamluk rulers and remains widespread today. In Tree of Pearls (2020), D. Fairchild Ruggles writes:

“The initial madrasa foundation had enabled the patron to embellish the streetscape, stake a claim to the city, and display his generosity and piety in his lifetime. But while it bore his name and titles, its primary purpose was to provide a place for teaching and study. The tomb, in contrast, existed for the sole purpose of commemoration. Like all mausolea, it stood as a visible sign whose express purpose was to preserve the memory of its occupant for eternity. With the unification of the tomb and madrasa, a new ensemble was created in which both functions were enhanced: the tomb absorbing the charitable purpose of the adjacent school and capturing its thrum of activity, the madrasa gaining new political purpose as an embodied site of memory—a critically important Ayyubid memory, which we recall was what Shajar al-Durr could offer as the last remaining link to the deceased sultan. Moreover, the complex occupied a more highly charged urban space than previous tombs and transformed the city around it, projecting into and defining the space of the street, its handsome minaret and large dome demanding that people pay attention.”

She also built a mausoleum for herself, sometime between 1250 and her death in 1257. Part of a larger charitable complex, only the tomb survives today, and it has recently been restored by the Athar Linna Foundation. Although built outside the walls of the Fatimid city, this tomb was—like the tomb she had built for Sultan Salih—an extraordinary and innovative structure. Ruggles writes:

It is commonly known that inscriptions provide an important means of communication in Islamic art and that images of people and animals are avoided altogether in Muslim religious settings such as mosques and tombs. Nonetheless, Shajar al-Durr managed to insert a clear reference to herself in the most highly charged place in any building where prayer occurs, the mihrab, where an image of an upright branch with pearlescent fruit recalls her name: shajar (tree) and durr (pearls).

== Impact ==
=== Establishing the Mamluk dynasty ===
As a manumitted slave who was not of the Ayyubid line, Shajar al-Durr has the distinction of having been the first Mamluk ruler of Egypt and Syria. Aybak and Shajar al-Durr firmly established the Mamluk dynasty that would ultimately repulse the Mongols, expel the European Crusaders from the Holy Land, and remain the most powerful political force in the Middle East until the coming of the Ottomans.

=== In Egyptian folklore ===
Shajar al-Durr is one of the characters of Sirat al-Zahir Baibars (Life of al-Zahir Baibars), a folkloric epic of thousands of pages that was composed in Egypt during the early Mamluk era and took its final form in the early Ottoman era. The tale, which is a mix of fiction and fact, reflects the fascination of Egyptian common people for both Baibars and Shajar al-Durr. Fatma Shajarat al-Durr, as the tale names Shajar al-Durr, was the daughter of Caliph al-Muqtadir whose kingdom in Baghdad was attacked by the Mongols. She was called Shajarat al-Durr (tree of pearls) because her father dressed her in a dress that was made of pearls. Her father granted her Egypt as she wished to be the Queen of Egypt and as-Salih Ayyub married her in order to stay in power as Egypt was hers. When Baibars was brought to the Citadel in Cairo, she loved him and treated him like a son and he called her his mother. Aybak al-Turkumani, a wicked man, came from al-Mousil to steal Egypt from Shajarat al-Durr and her husband al-Salih Ayyub. Shajarat al-Durr killed Aybak with a sword but, while fleeing from his son, she fell from the roof of the citadel and died. In addition, Shajar al-Durr's name actually means Tree of Pearls, which is why, in poetry, her mention shows a fruit tree that is formed by pieces of mother-of-pearl.

=== In literature and film ===
Tayeb Salih in his story "The Wedding of Zein" mentioned "Shajar ad-Durr" as "the former slave girl who ruled Egypt in the thirteenth century." He has a character in the story say, "A man's a man even though he's drooling, while a woman's a woman even if she's as beautiful as Shajar ad-Durr."

Shajar al-Durr was the subject of a 1935 film by Ahmed Galal called Shajarat al-Durr.

=== Coins ===
The following names and titles were inscribed on the coins of Shajar al-Durr: al-Musta'simiyah al-Salihiyah Malikat al-Muslimin walidat al-Malik al-Mansur Khalil Amir al-Mu'minin. (The Musta'simiyah the Salihiyah Queen of the Muslims Mother of King al-Mansur Khalil Emir of the faithful) and Shajarat al-Durr. The names of the Abbasid Chaliph were also inscribed on her coins: Abd Allah ben al-Mustansir Billah.

== See also ==
- List of rulers of Egypt

== Sources ==
- Abu al-Fida, The Concise History of Humanity.
- Al-Maqrizi, Al Selouk Leme'refatt Dewall al-Melouk, Dar al-kotob, 1997.
- Idem in English: Bohn, Henry G., The Road to Knowledge of the Return of Kings, Chronicles of the Crusades, AMS Press, 1969.
- Al-Maqrizi, al-Mawaiz wa al-'i'tibar bi dhikr al-khitat wa al-'athar, Matabat aladab, Cairo 1996, ISBN 977-241-175-X.
- Idem in French: Bouriant, Urbain, Description topographique et historique de l'Egypte, Paris 1895
- Ibn Iyas, Badai Alzuhur Fi Wakayi Alduhur, abridged and edited by Dr. M. Aljayar, Almisriya Lilkitab, Cairo 2007, ISBN 977-419-623-6
- Ibn Taghri, al-Nujum al-Zahirah Fi Milook Misr wa al-Qahirah, al-Hay'ah al-Misreyah 1968
- History of Egypt, 1382–1469 A.D. by Yusef. William Popper, translator Abu L-Mahasin ibn Taghri Birdi, University of California Press 1954
- Asly, B., al-Zahir Baibars, Dar An-Nafaes Publishing, Beirut 1992
- Goldstone, Nancy (2009). Four Queens: The Provençal Sisters Who Ruled Europe. London: Phoenix Paperbacks.
- Sadawi. H, Al-Mamalik, Maruf Ikhwan, Alexandria.
- Mahdi, Dr. Shafik, Mamalik Misr wa Alsham ( Mamluks of Egypt and the Levant), Aldar Alarabiya, Beirut 2008
- Shayyal, Jamal, Prof. of Islamic history, Tarikh Misr al-Islamiyah (History of Islamic Egypt), dar al-Maref, Cairo 1266, ISBN 977-02-5975-6
- Sirat al-Zahir Baibars, Printed by Mustafa al-Saba, Cairo 1923. Repulished in 5 volumes by Alhay'ah Almisriyah, Editor Gamal El-Ghitani, Cairo 1996, ISBN 977-01-4642-0
- Sirat al-Zahir Baibars, assembled H. Johar, M. Braniq, A. Atar, Dar Marif, Cairo 1986, ISBN 977-02-1747-6
- The chronicles of Matthew Paris ( Matthew Paris: Chronica Majora ) translated by Helen Nicholson 1989
- The Memoirs of the Lord of Joinville, translated by Ethel Wedgwood 1906
- The New Encyclopædia Britannica, Macropædia, H.H. Berton Publisher, 1973–1974
- Meri, Josef W. (Editor). Medieval Islamic Civilization: An Encyclopedia. Routledge, 2006. web page
- Perry, Glenn Earl. The History of Egypt – The Mamluk Sultanate. Greenwood Press, 2004. page 49
- Qasim, Abdu Qasim Dr., Asr Salatin AlMamlik ( era of the Mamluk Sultans ), Eye for human and social studies, Cairo 2007
- Irwin, Robert. The Middle East in the Middle Ages: The Early Mamluk Sultanate, 1250–1382. Routledge, 1986. web page
- Ruggles, D. Fairchild (2020). Tree of Pearls: the extraordinary architectural patronage of the 13th-century Egyptian slave-queen Shajar al-Durr. New York. p. 98. ISBN 978-0-19-087322-6. OCLC 1155808731.
- Ruggles, D. Fairchild (2016). "The Geographic and Social Mobility of Slaves: The Rise of Shajar al-Durr, a Slave-Concubine in 13th-century Egypt". The Medieval Globe. 2 (1): 41–55. doi:10.17302/tmg.2-1.4. S2CID 131500434.
- Ruggles, D. Fairchild (2015). "Visible and Invisible Bodies: The Architectural Patronage of Shajar al-Durr". Muqarnas. 32 (32): 63–78. doi:10.1163/22118993-00321P05. Archived from the original on 22 April 2021.

Shajar al-Durr Born: ? Died: 28 April 1257
Regnal titles
Preceded by Al-Muazzam Turanshah	Sultan of Egypt; 2 May – July 1250	Succeeded by Izz al-Din Aybak
