= Barons' Crusade =

Crusade of 1239-1241

- Part of the Crusades
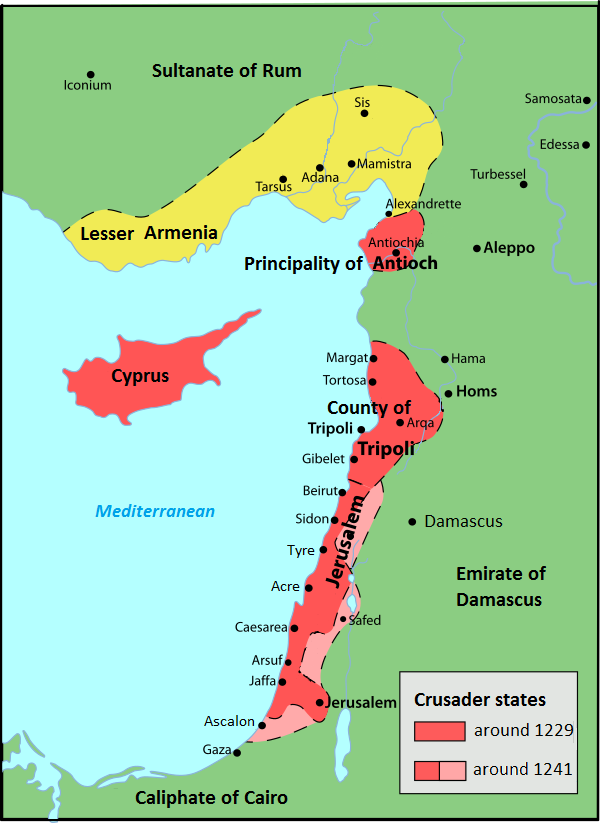
- Map depicting gains made by the crusade Red: Crusader states in 1239; Pink: territory acquired in 1239–41
| Date | 1239–1241 |
| Location | Acre, Jaffa, Gaza, Tripoli, Nablus |
| Result | Crusader diplomatic success; Kingdom of Jerusalem returned to largest size since 1187 |
| Territorial changes | Christians negotiated return of Jerusalem, Ascalon, Sidon, Tiberias, most of Galilee, Bethlehem, and Nazareth |

Belligerents
| Kingdom of Jerusalem; French and Navarre crusaders English crusaders County of Habsburg Military orders: Knights Templar; Knights Hospitaller; Teutonic Order | Ayyubids of Damascus Ayyubids of Egypt |

Commanders and leaders
| Theobald I of Navarre: Hugh IV of Burgundy; Amaury de Montfort (POW); Peter I of Brittany; Ralph of Soissons; Henry II of Bar †; Albert IV of Habsburg †; Guigues IV of Forez; John of Braine †; Pierre de Vieille-Brioude; Richard of Cornwall: Simon de Montfort; William II Longespée; Walter IV of Brienne: Odo of Montbéliard; Balian of Beirut; John of Arsuf; Balian of Sidon | As-Salih Ismail: An-Nasir Dawud; As-Salih Ayyub |

The Barons' Crusade (1239–1241), also called the Crusade of 1239, was a crusade to the Holy Land that, in territorial terms, was the most successful since the First Crusade. Called by Pope Gregory IX, the Barons' Crusade broadly embodied the highest point of papal endeavor "to make crusading a universal Christian undertaking." Gregory IX called for a crusade in France, England, and Hungary with different degrees of success. Although the crusaders did not achieve glorious military victories, they used diplomacy to successfully play the two warring factions of the Ayyubid dynasty (as-Salih Ismail in Damascus and as-Salih Ayyub in Egypt) against one another for even more concessions than Frederick II had gained during the more well-known Sixth Crusade. For a few years, the Barons' Crusade returned the Kingdom of Jerusalem to its largest size since 1187.

This crusade to the Holy Land is sometimes discussed as two separate crusades: that of King Theobald I of Navarre, which began in 1239; and, the separate host of crusaders under the leadership of Richard of Cornwall, which arrived after Theobald departed in 1240. Additionally, the Barons' Crusade is often described in tandem with Baldwin of Courtenay's concurrent trip to Constantinople and capture of Tzurulum with a separate, smaller force of crusaders. This is because Gregory IX briefly attempted to redirect the target of his new crusade from liberating the Holy Land from Muslims to protecting the Latin Empire of Constantinople from "schismatic" (i.e., Orthodox) Christians attempting to retake the city.

Despite relatively plentiful primary sources, scholarship until recently has been limited, due at least in part to the lack of major military engagements. Although Gregory IX went further than any other pope to create an ideal of Christian unity in the process of organizing the crusade, in practice the crusade's divided leadership did not reveal a unified Christian action or identity in response to taking the cross.

== Background ==
At the end of the Sixth Crusade in February 1229, Frederick II and Al-Kamil signed a 10-year truce. Using diplomacy alone and without major military confrontation, Frederick was given control of Jerusalem, Nazareth, Sidon, Jaffa, and Bethlehem. However, the treaty was set to expire in 1239, which endangered Christian control of the territories. Additionally, the Sixth Crusade was wildly unpopular among the native Christian leaders because the excommunicated Frederick left them defenseless, allied with their Muslim enemies, and attempted to gain control over the Holy Land for the House of Hohenstaufen rather than restore the territories to the local barons of the Kingdom of Jerusalem. Therefore, in 1234, Pope Gregory IX proclaimed that a new crusade should arrive in the Holy Land by 1239 to ensure Christian control. In his effort to unite the Christians to defend the crusaders' territorial control in the Holy Land, Gregory issued the papal bull Rachel suum videns, which was actively used by mendicant friars to promote the crusade in every corner of Christendom. Rachel suum videns reinforced the usage of a vow of redemption policy initiated by previous Pope Innocent III in his bull Quia maior during his campaign for the Fifth Crusade. However, Innocent did not ask all Christians to redeem their vows after they took the cross.

To make this crusade universal, Gregory obliged all Christians to attend crusade sermons, aiming to pray for the successful outcome and donate for the enterprise a large sum of money, one penny weekly for a decade. The preaching campaign had different success. While Italy, Germany, and Spain were mildly enthusiastic about Gregory's crusade, in Hungary, a few nobles and ecclesiastical officials became more actively engaged into the campaign. English and French knights and nobles initially also supported the pope's enterprise.

About a year later, in December 1235, Gregory began numerous attempts to fully, then partially, redirect this planned crusade away from the Holy Land to instead combat the spread of Christian heresy in Latin Greece. His attempt to divert the crusade to assist the Latin Empire of Constantinople was largely unsuccessful. The Latin emperor, John of Brienne, the most vigorous papal supporter out of the other rulers, permitted in Constantinople the presence of a Latin patriarch, which promised a possibility of unifying both Greek and Latin churches. The Hungarian military elite headed by its king Béla IV declined to go to Constantinople to fight the invading schismatics John III Doukas Vatatzes of Nicaea and Ivan Asen II of Bulgaria. In the summer of 1239, Hungarian king Béla allowed the heir to the Latin empire, Baldwin of Courtenay to cross the Hungarian border but declined to join Baldwin on his way to Constantinople. Simultaneously, Pope Gregory wrote a letter to the Dominicans' prior in Hungary asking him to preach the cross within the empire and exchange the vows for Jerusalem given by crusaders on those to Constantinople in return for indulgence. The pope promised indulgence to every soldier as well as to anyone who contributed money to the crusade. In February 1241, Gregory ordered to redirect the revenues collected in Hungary for a new military campaign against Frederic II, the German emperor. Baldwin of Courtenay, arrived in Constantinople first while other European knights and nobility; not unified, moved toward Jerusalem. In 1235, Gregory called upon French crusaders to fight in Constantinople instead of the Holy Land. On December 16, the pope ordered the Franciscan William of Cordelle to preach for crusade in Latin Greece. Theobald of Champagne responded to the call due to his need for papal support, but he ended up refusing to commute his vow for Jerusalem. In December 1238, Theobald received funding from Gregory for his crusade to Jerusalem. The disjointed groups of French barons traveled separately to the Holy Land, where they eventually faced military defeat followed by diplomatic success. The English barons, including brothers-in-law Richard of Cornwall and Simon de Montfort, were also divided and arrived there one year later.

== Crusade ==
=== Theobald I of Navarre's host ===
King Theobald I of Navarre gathered an impressive list of European nobles at Lyon, including: Duke Hugh IV of Burgundy; Amaury de Montfort; Robert of Courtenay, the grand butler of France; and Duke Peter I of Brittany. They were accompanied by a number of counts of secondary rank, including: Guigues IV of Forez, Count Henry II of Bar, Louis of Sancerre, Count John of Mâcon, William of Joigny, and Henry of Grandpré. Theobald's main force numbered some 1,500 knights, including a few hundred from Navarre. They departed France in August 1239, with most sailing from Marseille and a smaller number departing from Frederick II's ports in southern Italy. Theobald reached Acre on 1 September; he was soon joined by those crusaders who were scattered by a Mediterranean storm in transit. There they were met by a council of local Christian potentates, most prominently: Walter of Brienne, Odo of Montbéliard, Balian of Beirut, John of Arsuf, and Balian of Sidon. Theobald was also joined by some crusaders from Cyprus.

Theobald spent much time dallying at pleasant Acre, where he wrote a poem to his wife. Finally on 2 November, the group of about 4000 knights (more than half from the local barons and the military orders) marched to Ascalon, where they would begin the construction of a castle which had been demolished by Saladin decades prior. Two days into the march, Peter I of Brittany and his lieutenant Ralph of Soissons split off to conduct a raid. They divided their forces and each waited in ambush along a possible route for the Muslim caravan which was moving up the Jordan to Damascus. Peter's half clashed with the Muslims outside a castle, and after some fighting, he sounded his horn to summon Ralph. The Muslims were routed and fled inside the castle, where Peter's men followed them, killed many, took some captives, and seized the booty and edible animals of the caravan.

==== Defeat at Gaza and loss of Jerusalem ====
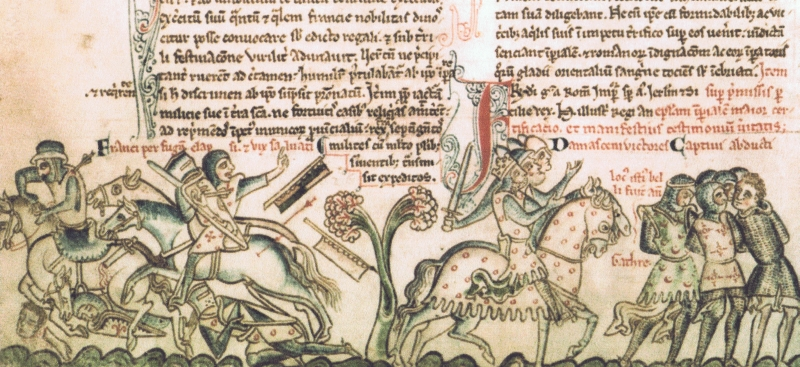
The 1239 Beit Hanoun battle, by Matthew Paris

Peter's minor victory would soon be overshadowed. When the complete army reached Jaffa on 12 November 1239, a subset of the army wanted to conduct a raid of their own. The leaders of this defiant group were Henry II of Bar, Amaury de Montfort, and Hugh IV of Burgundy, alongside four of the major local lords, including Walter of Brienne, Balian of Sidon, John of Arsuf, and Odo of Montbéliard. This group, which included somewhere between 400 and 600 knights, split off from the main army, against the clear protests of Theobald, Peter of Brittany, and the leaders of all three of the military orders (the Knights Templar, the Knights Hospitaller, and the Teutonic Order). The group rode all night and a portion of them soon battled an Egyptian force commanded by Rukn al-Din al-Hijawi at the battle at Gaza on the following day, 13 November. The contingent was soundly defeated before Theobald's forces could arrive to rescue them; Henry was killed, and Amaury was among several hundred crusaders taken prisoner. The army then marched all the way back to Acre.

About a month after the battle at Gaza, an-Nasir Dawud of Transjordan, whose caravan had been seized by Peter, marched on Jerusalem, which was largely undefended. After a month of being holed up in the Tower of David, the garrison of the citadel surrendered to Dawud on 7 December, accepting his offer for safe passage to Acre. Jerusalem was in Muslim hands for the first time since 1229 (the Sixth Crusade).

==== Ayyubid territorial concessions ====
Matthew Paris's illustration of the treaty between Peter and Dawud

After the crusaders' setback at Gaza and the loss of Jerusalem, a civil war within the Muslim Ayyubid dynasty began to create a fortunate environment for the Christians. First, there was a promising but ultimately disappointing trip to Tripoli. The emir Al-Muzaffar II Mahmud of Hama wanted to distract his enemy, Al-Mujahid of Homs, so he lured Theobald's crusaders to Pilgrim Mountain outside of Tripoli with empty promises. Nothing happened; after a time as guests of Bohemond V of Antioch, the crusaders had returned to Acre by early May 1240.

The Christians' next encounter with the Ayyubids proved dramatically more fruitful. Theobald negotiated with the warring emirs of Damascus and Egypt. He finalized a treaty with As-Salih Ismail, Emir of Damascus in the north, against Ayyub of Egypt and Dawud of Transjordan, in the south, whereby the Kingdom of Jerusalem regained Jerusalem itself, plus Bethlehem, Nazareth, and most of the region of Galilee with many Templar castles, such as Beaufort and Saphet. Ismail's treaty with the crusaders included much territory that was not his to give: rather, it was a recognition of their right to take Dawud's lands. This treaty was very unpopular among Ismail's own subjects: the influential preacher and jurist Izz al-Din ibn 'Abd al-Salam publicly denounced it. Ismail had Ibn 'Abd al-Salam arrested in response. In an act of even more dramatic protest, the Muslim garrison of Beaufort refused to turn over the castle to Balian of Sidon, as Ismail's accord stipulated. Ismail himself had to besiege the stronghold with the army of Damascus for months, to seize it for the Christians. Meanwhile, the crusaders set about pursuing their claims to Dawud's lands. They began to rebuild Ascalon, raided throughout the Jordan valley, retook Jerusalem, and attacked Nablus (but did not capture it). This forced Dawud to negotiate his own treaty with Theobald in the late summer of 1240, fulfilling in fact many of the concessions which had been granted only in theory by Ismail.

Some contemporary sources even imply that the whole of the land between the Jordan River and the Mediterranean was put back in crusader hands. Theobald and Peter of Brittany did not remain to see their agreements with Ismail of Damascus and Dawud of Transjordan fully carried out. They departed from Palestine for Europe in mid-September 1240, before Richard of Cornwall arrived, because they did not wish to be present during any more internal quarreling over the leadership and direction of the enterprise. Souvenirs that Theobald brought back to Europe included the rose called "Provins" (Latin name rosa gallica 'officinalis', the Apothecary's Rose) from Damascus, transporting it "in his helmet"; a piece of the True Cross. Hugh of Burgundy and Guigues of Forez stayed behind to assist with the castle at Ascalon.

=== Richard of Cornwall's host ===
On 10 June 1240 Richard, 1st Earl of Cornwall left England with a smaller host of crusaders. This group consisted of roughly a dozen English barons and several hundred knights, including William II Longespée. They made their way to Marseille in mid-September, and landed at Acre during the autumn passage on 8 October. Simon de Montfort, younger brother of the captured Amaury, was also part of this group but seems to have traveled separately. He and his wife Eleanor went to Brindisi through Apulia and Lombardy all the way to Acre. Eleanor accompanied her husband only to Brindisi. Following that, William of Forz organized the third successful expedition to Jerusalem. In the end, the response of English barons to Gregory's call revealed a lack of indication of a common Christian identity.

Richard and this second crusading host saw no combat, but they did complete the negotiations for a truce with Ayyubid leaders made by Theobald just a few months prior during the first wave of the crusade. They continued the rebuilding of Ascalon castle. Notably, Richard handed over custody of it to Walter Pennenpié, the imperial agent of Frederick II in Jerusalem (instead of turning it over to the local liege men of the Kingdom of Jerusalem who strongly opposed Frederick's rule). On 23 April 1241 they exchanged Muslim prisoners with Christian prisoners (most notably Simon's older brother Amaury) who had been seized during Henry of Bar's disastrous raid at Gaza one year and a half earlier. They also moved the remains of those killed in that battle and buried them at the cemetery in Ascalon. His work done, Richard departed at Acre for England on 3 May 1241.

== Aftermath ==
Although the Barons' Crusade returned the Kingdom of Jerusalem to its largest size since 1187, the gains would be dramatically reversed merely a few years later. On July 15, 1244, the Siege of Jerusalem left the city not only captured but reduced to ruins, its Christians massacred by Khwarazmians from northern Syria (new allies of the Sultan of Egypt As-Salih Ayyub). A few months later, in October, Ayyub and the Khwarazmians achieved a major military victory at the Battle of La Forbie, which permanently crippled Christian military power in the Holy Land.

== Baldwin of Courtenay's concurrent crusade to Tzurulum ==
A small, entirely separate crusading group heeded Pope Gregory's call to redirect the Barons' Crusade to defend the Latin Empire from John III Doukas Vatatzes of Nicaea and Ivan Asen II of Bulgaria. At the beginning of July in 1239, Baldwin of Courtenay the nineteen-year-old heir to the Latin Empire and Marquis of Namur, travelled to Constantinople with a small army (three times smaller than Barons' Crusade expedition) including the five secular magnates Humbert of Beaujeu, Thomas of Marle, Josseran of Brancion, William of Cayeaux, and Watins of La Haverie. On his way, with the help of Louis IX, Baldwin was able to cross the territory of Frederick II. He continued his way through Germany and Hungary, and at the Bulgarian border, he received a friendly invitation from Ivan Asen II and permission to march through his lands. In the winter of 1239, Baldwin finally returned to Constantinople, where he was crowned emperor sometime around Easter of 1240, after which he launched his crusade. Baldwin then besieged and captured Tzurulum, a Nicaean stronghold 75 miles (120 km) west of Constantinople. Tzurulum was the place where two major eastbound routes on the way to Constantinople converged, one led from Thessalonica, and the other from Adrianople. The possession of this strategically important site should have provided more security for Constantinople. However, this victory could not compensate for the loss of two other Asia Minor fortresses, Darivya and Niketiaton (now in the village of Eskihisar) which were captured by Vatatzes. Despite Baldwin's possession of Tzurulum, the Latin Empire continued to depend on western aid until its collapse two decades later in 1261.

== Sources ==
- Balard, Michel (1989). "La croisade de Thibaud IV de Champagne (1239–1240)". In Yvonne Bellenger; Danielle Quéruel (eds.). Les Champenois et la croisade. Paris: Aux amateurs de livres. pp. 85–95.
- Burgtorf, Jochen (2011). "Gaza, Battle of (1239)". In Alexander Mikaberidze (ed.). Conflict and Conquest in the Islamic World: A Historical Encyclopedia, Volume 1. Santa Barbara: ABC-CLIO. pp. 331–32.
- Edbury, Peter W. (1993). The Kingdom of Cyprus and the Crusades, 1191–1374. Cambridge University Press.
- Jackson, Peter (1987). "The Crusades of 1239–41 and Their Aftermath". Bulletin of the School of Oriental and African Studies, University of London. 50 (1): 32–60. doi:10.1017/s0041977x00053180. S2CID 161747361.
- Lower, Michael (2003). "The Burning at Mont-Aimé: Thibaut of Champagne's Preparations for the Barons' Crusade of 1239". Journal of Medieval History. 29 (2): 95–108. doi:10.1016/s0304-4181(03)00016-2. S2CID 159566125.
- Lower, Michael (2005). The Barons' Crusade: A Call to Arms and Its Consequences. Philadelphia: University of Pennsylvania Press.
- Madden, Thomas F. (2006). The New Concise History of the Crusades. Rowman & Littlefield. ISBN 978-0-7425-3823-8.
- Narbaitz, Pierre (2007) [Original publication 1978]. Nabarra, ou quand les Basques avaient des rois [Navarra, o cuando los vascos tenían reyes] (in French). Translated by Barberena, Elena. Tafalla: Txalaparta. ISBN 978-8-48136-488-0.
- Painter, Sidney (1969). "The Crusade of Theobald of Champagne and Richard of Cornwall, 1239–1241". In Robert Lee Wolff; Harry W. Hazard (eds.). A History of the Crusades, Volume II: The Later Crusades, 1189–1311. Madison: University of Wisconsin Press. pp. 463–86.
- Painter, Sidney (2019) [1937]. The Scourge of the Clergy: Peter of Dreux, Duke of Brittany. Johns Hopkins University Press. ISBN 9781421436586.
- Röhricht, Reinhold (1886). "Die Kreuzzüge des Grafen Theobald von Navarra und Richard von Cornwallis nach dem heiligen Lande". Forschungen zur Deutschen Geschichte. 36: 67–81.
- Siberry, Elizabeth (1990). "The Crusading Counts of Nevers". Nottingham Medieval Studies. 34: 64–70. doi:10.1484/j.nms.3.181.
- Tyerman, Christopher (2006). God's War: A New History of the Crusades. London: Penguin.
