= As-Salih Ayyub =

Ayyubid sultan of Egypt from 1240 to 1249

As-Salih Najm Al-Din Ayyub
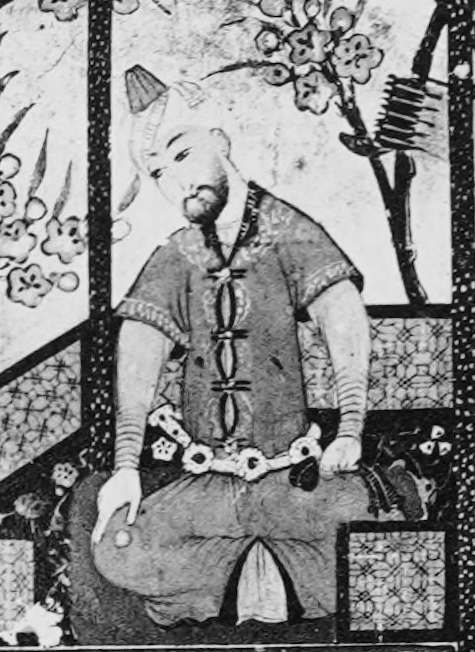
- Malik Salih Ayyub (detail), Prince of Damascus and great-nephew of Saladin, conversing with Dervishes he has met at the Mosque. (The Pleasure Garden, by Sadi of Shiraz. Bokhara, 1555. Bibliothèque Nationale, Paris)

Sultan of Egypt
- Reign: 1240 – 22 November 1249
- Predecessor: Al-Adil II
- Successor: Al-Muazzam Turanshah

Emir of Damascus (first reign)
- Reign: 1239
- Predecessor: Al-Adil II
- Successor: As-Salih Ismail

(second reign)
- Reign: 1245 – 22 November 1249
- Predecessor: As-Salih Ismail
- Successor: Al-Muazzam Turanshah
- Born: 5 November 1205; Cairo
- Died: 22 November 1249 (aged 44)
- Burial: Salihiyya Madrasa, Cairo
- Consort: Shajar al-Durr; Bint al-Alima
- Issue: Al-Muazzam Turanshah
Names
- Salih Najm al-Din Ayyub
- Dynasty: Ayyubid dynasty
- Father: Al-Kamil
- Mother: Ward Al-Muna
- Religion: Sunni Islam
- Military career
- Conflicts: Barons' Crusade; Battle at Gaza (1239); Seventh Crusade; Siege of Jerusalem (1244); Siege of Ascalon (1247); Battle of La Forbie

Al-Malik as-Salih Najm al-Din Ayyub (Arabic: الصالح نجم الدين أيوب; 5 November 1205 – 22 November 1249), Kunya: Abu al-Futuh (Kurdish:باوکی سەرکەوتنەکان)(Arabic: أبو الفتوح), also known as al-Malik al-Salih, was the Ayyubid ruler of Egypt from 1240 to 1249.

== Early life ==
As-Salih was born in 1205, the son of Al-Kamil and a Nubian concubine. Her name was Ward Al-Muna and she was also the servant of Al-Kamil's other wife, Sawda bint Al-Faqih, the mother of Adil. In 1221, he became a hostage at the end of the Fifth Crusade, while John of Brienne became a hostage of as-Salih's father Al-Kamil, until Damietta was reconstructed and restored to Egypt. In 1232, he was given Hasankeyf in the Jazirah (now part of Turkey), which his father had captured from the Artuqids. In 1234 his father sent him to rule Damascus, removing him from the succession in Egypt after suspecting him of conspiring against him with the Mamluks.

In 1238, al-Kamil died leaving as-Salih his designated heir in the Jazirah, and his other son Al-Adil II as his heir in Egypt. In the dynastic disputes which followed, as-Salih took control of Damascus in 1239 and set about using it as a base for enlarging his domain.

He received representations from his father's old emirs in Egypt, who appealed to him to remove his brother. While making ready to invade Egypt he was informed that his brother had been captured by his soldiers and was being held prisoner. As-Salih was invited to come at once and assume the Sultanate.

In August 1239, Ayyub began pressuring Al-Salih Ismail to join him at Nablus for the campaign to take over Egypt from al-Adil II. Ayyub began to grow suspicious of Ismail's perceived procrastination and sent a noted physician, Sa'd al-Din al-Dimashqi, to find out what his vassal was doing. Ismail's vizier discovered Ayyub's scheme and secretly forged al-Dimashqi's records to mislead Ayyub into thinking Ismail was indeed on his way to Nablus. Eventually, Ismail, with the support of the Ayyubids of Kerak, Hama and Homs, captured Damascus from Ayyub in September 1239. Ayyub was abandoned by his troops and taken captive by local Bedouin who transferred him to al-Nasir Dawud's control, in which he was held as a prisoner in Kerak, along with Shajar al-Durr who gave birth to their son Khalil, and his Mamluk Rukn al-Din Baybars al-Salihi.

In April 1240, An-Nasir, quarreling with al-Adil II, released Ayyub and allied with him against the Egyptians, in return for a promise that Ayyub would reinstall him in Damascus. Al-Adil was imprisoned by his own troops, and Ayyub and An-Nasir made a triumphal entry into Cairo in June 1240, hence As-Salih became the paramount ruler of the Ayyubid family.

== Rise of the Mamluks ==
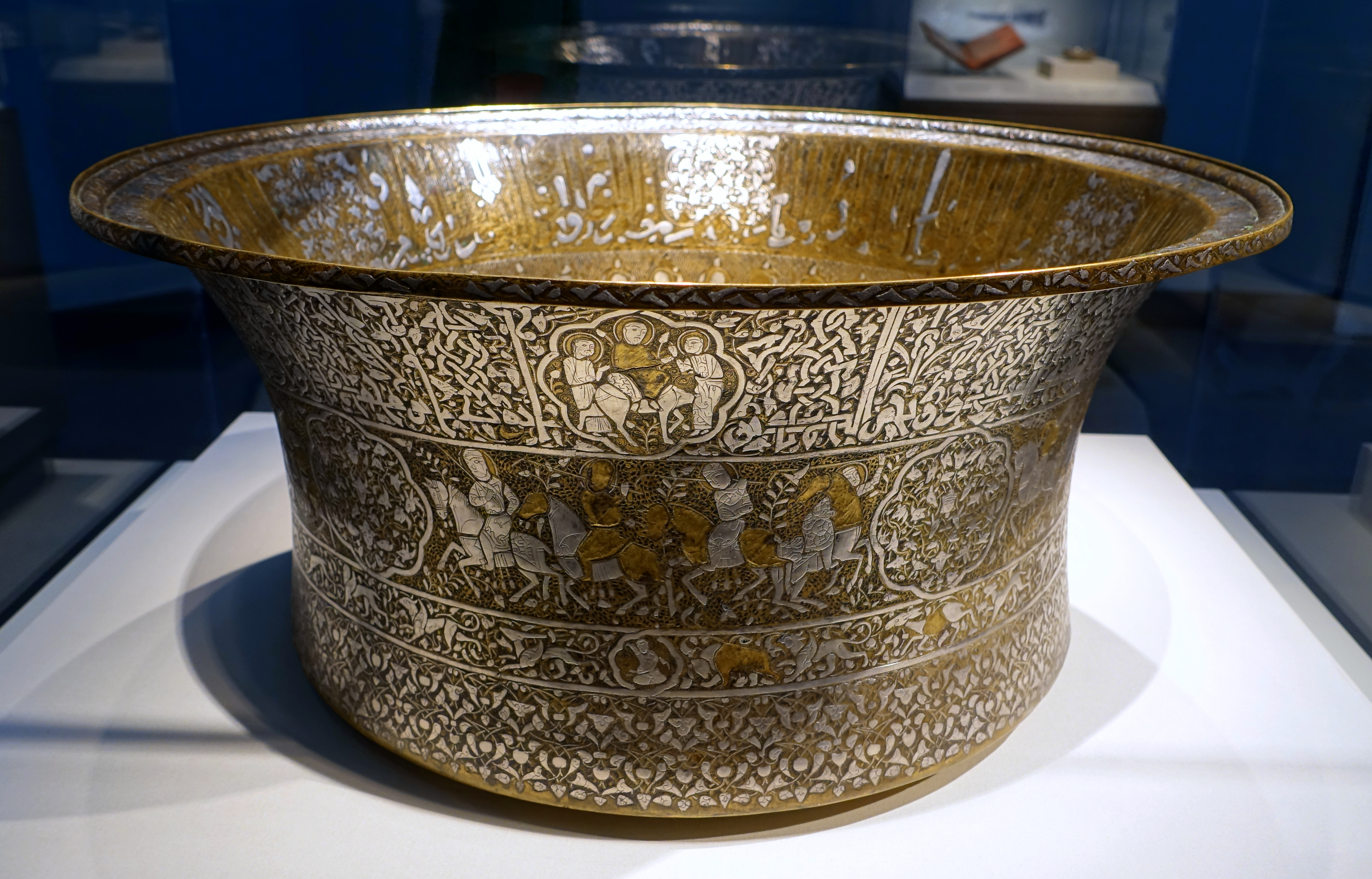
Basin made for Sultan As-Salih Ayyub, Damascus, 1247-1249. Brass inlaid with silver. Freer Gallery of Art.

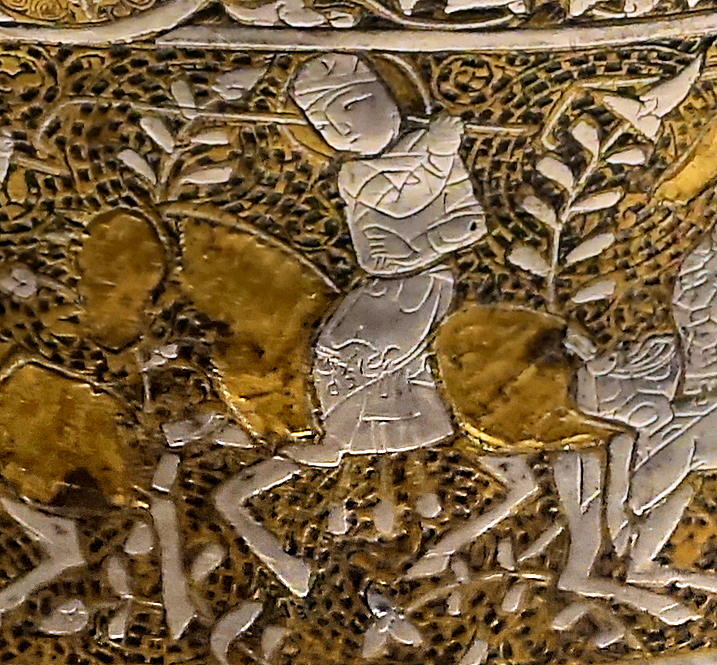
Horseman playing polo (detail). Damascus, 1247-1249. Brass inlaid with silver. Freer Gallery of Art.

Once installed in Cairo, As-Salih was far from secure. The complex nature of the Ayyubid state meant that the ruling family itself, as well as associated Kurdish clans, had divided loyalties. Within Egypt, a powerful faction of Emirs, the Ashrafiyya, were conspiring to depose and replace him with his uncle, Ismail, who had regained control of Damascus after his departure. As-Salih shut himself in the Cairo citadel, and could no longer trust even the once-loyal Emirs who had brought him to power. The lack of loyal soldiers led him to begin buying large numbers of Kipchak slaves, who were available in unusually large numbers following the Mongol invasions in central Asia. They soon formed the core of his army, and were known as Mamluks.

As-Salih was not the first Ayyubid ruler to make use of Mamluks, but he was the first to depend on them so heavily. Rather than just recruiting small numbers of Mamluks, As-Salih established two complete corps of them, numbering up to 1000 men each. One unit was known as the 'River Corps' or Baḥrīyah or Bahriyya, because they were garrisoned at Rawḍah Island in the Nile. The second, smaller corps was the Jamdārīyah, and appears to have operated as a body guard for As-Salih.

As the Mamluks would eventually overthrow the Ayyubid dynasty and take power on their own, their early rise to prominence under As-Salih Ayyub is of considerable historical importance. In English, references to the Bahriyya after As-Salih's death, when they became the dominant power in Egypt, usually describe them as the Bahri Mamluks. The members of the Bahriyya who were recruited by As-Salih himself are also sometimes referred to as the Salihiyya. During his lifetime these terms were synonymous.

== Wars with other Ayyubid realms and the Crusaders ==
The period 1240–1243 was largely occupied with complex military and diplomatic manoeuvres involving the Crusader states in Palestine and the European armies that arrived during the Barons' Crusade, other Ayyubid family rulers in Syria, and the Khwarezmians of Diyar Mudar who had previously been allied to as-Salih.

Just as his Bahri Mamluks were important in enabling him to maintain order in Egypt, the Khwarezmians were useful in dominating the other Ayyubid rulers in neighbouring regions. In 1244, at As-Salih's invitation, the remainder of the Khwarezmian army which had just been crushed and routed by the Mongols advanced through Syria and Palestine and sacked Jerusalem, which had been handed over to Frederick II, Holy Roman Emperor by al-Kamil during the Sixth Crusade.

Later that year as-Salih, again allied to the Khwarezmians, defeated his uncle Ismail at the Battle of La Forbie in Syria; Ismail had allied with the crusader Kingdom of Jerusalem. In 1245 as-Salih captured Damascus and was awarded the title of sultan by the caliph al-Musta'sim in Baghdad. As-Salih, however, was not able to extend his rule very far beyond Damascus, although he was able to retain the emirate of Baalbek under Saʿd al-Din al-Humaidi.

In 1246 he decided that his Khwarezmian allies were dangerously uncontrollable, so he turned on them and defeated them near Homs in western Syria, killing their leader and dispersing the remnants throughout Syria and Palestine. As-Salih's capture of Jerusalem after the Khwarezmian sacking led to the call for a new crusade in Europe, and Louis IX of France took up the cross. The campaign took several years to organise, but in 1249 Louis invaded Egypt on the Seventh Crusade, and occupied Damietta.

== Death and legacy ==
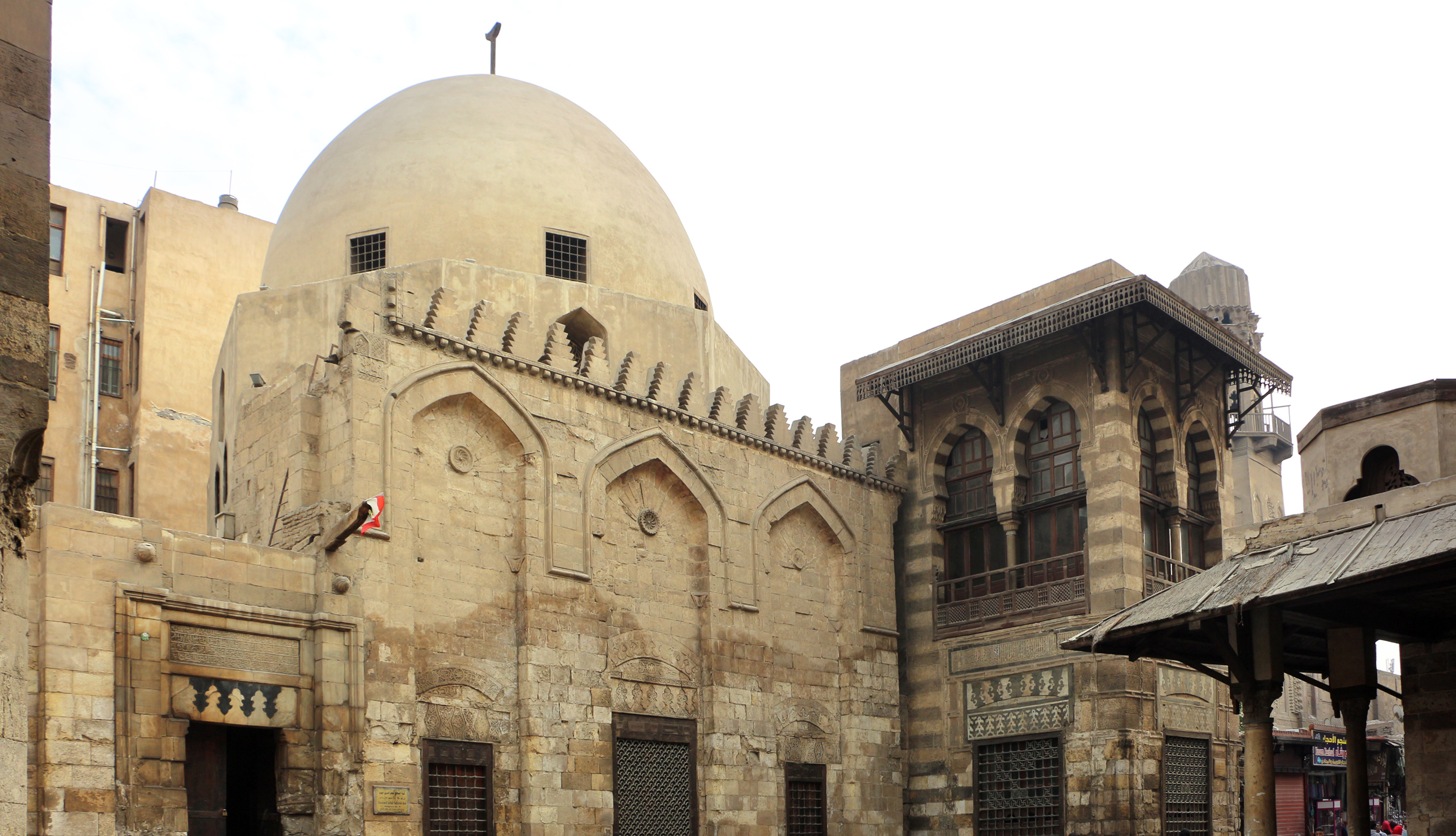
The Salihiyya Madrasa in Cairo, where Sultan As-Salih Ayyub is buried.

As-Salih was away fighting his uncle Ismail in Syria when news of the Crusader invasion came, but he quickly returned to Egypt and encamped at al-Mansourah. He died on 22 November after having his leg amputated due to a serious abscess. As-Salih did not trust his heir, al-Muazzam Turanshah, and had kept him at a safe distance from Egypt in Hasankeyf. As-Salih's widow, Shajar al-Durr, managed to hide his death until Turanshah arrived.

Turanshah's rule was brief and was followed by a long and complicated interregnum until the Bahri Mamluks eventually took power. As-Salih was thus the last major Ayyubid ruler of Egypt, and the last to combine rule of Egypt with effective rule of parts of Palestine and Syria.

== Sources ==
- Al-Maqrizi, Al Selouk Leme'refatt Dewall al-Melouk, Dar al-kotob, 1997.
- Humphreys, R. Stephen (1977), From Saladin to the Mongols: The Ayyubids of Damascus, 1193–1260, Albany, New York: State University of New York Press, ISBN 0-87395-263-4
- Irwin, Robert (1986), The Middle East in the Middle Ages: The Early Mamluk Sultanate, 1250–1382, Southern Illinois University Press / Croom Helm, ISBN 1-5974-0466-7
- Riley-Smith, Jonathan, ed. (1990), The Atlas of the Crusades, Times Books, ISBN 0816021864
- Whelan, Estelle (1988), "Representations of the Khassakiyah and the Origins of Mamluk Emblems", in Soucek, Priscilla (ed.), Content and Context of Visual Arts in the Islamic World, University Park, Pennsylvania: Pennsylvania State University Press

== See also ==
- List of rulers of Egypt

As-Salih Ayyub Ayyubid dynasty Born: 5 November 1205 Died: 22 November 1249
Regnal titles
Preceded by Al-Adil II	Sultan of Egypt; 1240 – 22 November 1249	Succeeded by Al-Muazzam Turanshah
Preceded by Al-Adil II	Emir of Damascus; 1239	Succeeded by As-Salih Ismail
Preceded by As-Salih Ismail	Emir of Damascus; 1245 – 22 November 1249	Succeeded by Al-Muazzam Turanshah
