= Al-Salih Ismail, Emir of Damascus =

Ayyubid emir of Damascus from 1237 to 1245

Imad al-Din Ismail
- Al-Malik al-Salih

Emir of Damascus
- Reign: 1237–1245
- Coronation: 1237
- Predecessor: Al-Ashraf
- Successor: Al-Salih Ayyub
- Born: Damascus, Ayyubid Sultanate
- Died: 1245
- Burial: Damascus, Ayyubid Sultanate
Names
- Imad al-Din al-Malik al-Salih Ismail bin Saif al-Din Ahmad
- Dynasty: Ayyubid
- Father: Al-Adil I
- Religion: Sunni Islam

Al-Malik al-Salih Imad al-Din Ismail bin Saif al-Din Ahmad better known as al-Salih Ismail (Arabic: الصالح إسماعيل) was the Ayyubid sultan based in Damascus. He reigned twice, once in 1237 and then again from 1239 to 1245.

== Biography ==
In 1237, al-Salih Ismail's brother, al-Ashraf, the ruler of Damascus died. Ismail succeeded him and two months later, the Ayyubid sultan of Egypt, al-Kamil, sent forces to besiege the city. Ismail had the suburbs of Damascus burned to prevent the Egyptian forces shelter. On al-Kamil's death his son al-Adil II occupied Damascus after his brother al-Salih Ayyub, the ruler of al-Jazira, revealed his intentions to succeed al-Kamil as sultan in Egypt. Ayyub was invited to take over Damascus by some of the local governors of Syria and accomplished the conquest in December 1238. Initially, Ismail, who was already governor (emir) of Bosra and Baalbek, allied himself with Ayyub.

In August 1239, Ayyub began pressuring Ismail to join him at Nablus for the campaign to take over Egypt from al-Adil II. Ismail promised to come as soon as he could equip his forces, but meantime, he would send his son al-Mansur Mahmud with a small contingent. Eventually Ayyub began to grow suspicious of Ismail's perceived procrastination and sent a noted physician, Sa'd al-Din al-Dimashqi, to find out what his vassal was doing. Ismail's vizier discovered Ayyub's scheme and secretly forged al-Dimashqi's recordings to mislead Ayyub into thinking Ismail was indeed on his way to Nablus. When he felt ready enough, he requested from Ayyub the return of al-Mansur Mahmud to Baalbek where he would administer affairs while he was absent on the campaign for Egypt. Ayyub complied.

Ismail, with the support of the Ayyubids of Kerak, Hama and Homs, captured Damascus from Ayyub in September 1239. Ayyub was abandoned by his troops and taken captive by local Bedouin who transferred him to al-Nasir Dawud's control. This ushered in an era of future rivalry between Ismail and Ayyub. Ayyub eventually ascended to rule the Egypt-based sultanate with Dawud's help, but he soon quarreled with him. Dawud and Ismail had reconciled and decided to establish an alliance with the Crusaders to prevent Ayyub from conquering their territories. In July 1240 during the Barons' Crusade, an agreement was brokered via Theobald I of Navarre, with the Crusaders allying with Damascus against Egypt. The Crusaders would secure the southern border of Palestine from Ayyub, while Ismail was forced to effectively cede all of the land west of the Jordan River that Saladin had gained for the Ayyubids in 1187, including Jerusalem, Bethlehem, Gaza, and Nablus. Ismail also gave up his own fortresses in Hunin, Tiberias, Beaufort, and Safad. The terms of the treaty provoked outcries and consternation throughout the Arab world, and Muslim imams denounced Ismail because of the loss of Jerusalem.

== Bibliography ==
- Abulafia, David; McKitterick, Rosamond; Fouracre, Paul (2005), The New Cambridge Medieval History, Cambridge University Press, ISBN 978-0-521-36289-4
- Burns, Ross (2005), Damascus: A History, Routledge, ISBN 978-0-415-27105-9
- Folda, Jaroslav (2005), Crusader art in the Holy Land: from the Third Crusade to the fall of Acre, 1187-1291, Cambridge University Press, ISBN 978-0-521-83583-1
- Humphreys, R. Stephen (1977), From Saladin to the Mongols: The Ayyubids of Damascus, 1193-1260, SUNY Press, ISBN 978-0-87395-263-7
- Richard, Jean; Birell, Jean (1999), The Crusades, c. 1071-c. 1291, Cambridge University Press, ISBN 978-0-521-62566-1

Regnal titles
Preceded by al-Salih Ayyub	Emir of Damascus; 1239–1245	Succeeded by al-Salih Ayyub
