= Siege of al-Bira (1272) =

1272 Mongol siege of Mamluk fortress

- Part of Mamluk–Ilkhanid War
Date	November–December 1272
Location	al-Bira (modern Birecik, Turkey) 37°01′30″N 37°58′43″E
Result	Mamluk victory

Belligerents
Mamluk Sultanate of Egypt	Ilkhanate

Commanders and leaders
Sultan Baybars; Qalawun; Al-Adil Kitbugha	Durbai Noyan; Chinqar †

Strength
unknown	11,000 soldiers: 3,000 Seljuks; Unknown amount of Siege Machines

Casualties and losses
Unknown	Heavy casualties 200 POW; Capture of all Siege Machines

The Siege of al-Bira in 1272 occurred when the Ilkhanid Mongols, under the command of Durbai Noyan, surrounded the strategic Mamluk frontier fortress of al-Bira (modern Birecik, Turkey). While the Mongols successfully surrounded the fortress, they were unable to capture it before Mamluk Sultan Baybars arrived with a relief army, forcing a Mongol retreat across the Euphrates River.

== Background ==
Al-Bira was a well-fortified fortress located approximately 60 kilometers (37 mi) west of Edessa (modern Urfa). It was situated on a natural ford across the northern part of the Euphrates River. The Mongols considered the fortress to be the "gate of Syria," and for the same reason, it became a key defensive position for the Mamluk Sultanate. The contemporary Mamluk historian Shafi' bin Ali el-Masry, whose chronicles are considered among the most important primary sources for the Mamluk era, similarly described the fortress as "the lock of Syria." Following the establishment of the Ilkhanate, Mongol military operations on the Euphrates frontier primarily targeted the two main Mamluk fortresses, al-Bira and al-Rahba.

Although al-Bira was well built, continuously maintained, and hosted a reinforced garrison, its defensive viability ultimately depended on the ability of the main Mamluk field army to arrive within days or weeks to relieve it during a siege.

=== First siege of al-Bira (1259) ===
The first siege of al-Bira occurred in December 1259. The bulk of the Mongol army, led by Hulegu Khan, successfully captured the fortress within two weeks. However, three years later in 1262, the Mamluks recaptured the site. Sultan Baybars rebuilt the fortifications and granted the outpost a special status due to its immense strategic value.

=== Second siege of al-Bira (1264–1265) ===
In late 1264, a month before the death of Hulegu Khan, al-Bira was besieged for a second time. By this point, the regional military balance had shifted drastically. The Mongol defeat at the Battle of Ain Jalut in 1260 had shattered the perception of Mongol invincibility, allowing Baybars to effectively organize the Mamluk frontier.

Between December 1264 and January 1265, an Ilkhanid army of 1 Tümen , approximately 10,000 soldiers, constructed 17 siege engines around al-Bira. The attackers filled sections of the fortress moats with wood to push their siege machines up to the walls. The Mamluk garrison responded quickly, setting the wood on fire and foiling the operation. A second Mongol attempt to breach the walls also failed. In mid-February 1265, the siege was abandoned after the Mongols received news that a Mamluk relief army was en route from Cairo. Following the retreat, Baybars ordered the fortress to be further repaired and its garrison reinforced. A contingent from the Kingdom of Cilician Armenia of 200 cavalrymen under King Hethum I was intended to reinforce the Mongol siege, but they turned back upon learning of the retreat.

== Siege ==
On 28 November 1272, Baybars received news in Damascus that an Ilkhanid Mongol army was marching toward al-Bira. He immediately set out with his army, a large portion of which consisted of troops from Egypt who had been stationed in Syria earlier that year. Baybars dispatched a detachment under Fakhr al-Din Altunba al-Himsi to Harem, while another unit under Taybars al-Waziri was sent as an advance guard towards al-Bira.

Baybars marched to Hama, where he acquired boats for the crossing of the Euphrates. Upon entering the Aleppo region, Baybars sent ahead a scouting force of Mamluks and Bedouins to scout the enemy positions. At Manbij, the scouts returned and reported that some 3,000 Mongols were on the east bank of the Euphrates. Baybars and his main army reached the banks of the Euphrates on 11 December.

The invading Mongol army was under the supreme command of Durbai Noyan, who had previously led the 1264 siege of al-Bira. The coalition force included a contingent of roughly 3,000 troops from the Seljuk Sultanate of Rum participating in the siege, along with a force of 5,000 men stationed at the river banks under the command of Chinqar. To prosecute the siege, the Mongols erected mangonels and other siege machines. They had prepared extensively for the arrival of the Mamluk relief army. Chinqar's forces took up positions at a difficult ford, hoping the Mamluks would mistake it as shallow, The Mongols additionally constructed a palisade along the river, positioning themselves behind it to fight dismounted with bows and arrows.

The Mongol strategy worked and the Mamluk army chose to the most difficult ford. Baybars first sent his foot archers across in boats to scout the terrain of the east bank. The main Mamluk army then began crossing the deep river, swimming alongside their horses. Qalawun and his elite vanguard were the first to make landfall on the bank, with Baybars following closely behind.

Once the Mamluks began climbing onto the east bank, fierce hand-to-hand combat erupted. In spite of their advantageous defensive positions, the Mongols were defeated. Their commander, Chinqar, was killed by Al-Adil Kitbugha, and some 200 Mongols were captured.

When Durbai and the main army besieging the fortress received news of the crushing defeat, they panicked. Although reports indicated they were on the verge of capturing the fortress, the Mongols abruptly abandoned their posts, left behind their mangonels and siege equipment, and fled. A Mamluk force led by Badr al-Din Baysari relentlessly pursued the retreating Mongols from al-Bira all the way to Saruj.

Upon his arrival at the successfully relieved fortress, Baybars personally rewarded the governor and the garrison defenders for their resilience. With the frontier secured, Baybars set back for Damascus, reaching the city on 26 December.

== Aftermath ==
Had the Mongol siege of al-Bira been successful, Abaqa Khan would have established a permanent bridgehead in Mamluk territory, placing the Ilkhanate in a superior position for a future full-scale invasion of Syria. Because of the failure, Abaqa was furious with Durbai Noyan for the result. When Durbai returned to the capital, the Ilkhan publicly rebuked and reviled him, demanding to know how he had managed to flee the battlefield unwounded while his fellow commander, Chinqar, had been killed in action. Consequently, Durbai was stripped of his position, exiled, and his regional command was transferred to Abtai.

=== Fourth Siege of al-Bira (1275) ===
During the winter of 1275, Abaqa Khan dispatched another massive expeditionary force under the command of Abtai to attempt to capture al-Bira. This new Mongol coalition army numbered 30,000 men, half of whom were Seljuk troops from the Sultanate of Rum mobilized under the authority of the Pervane. In Damascus, Baybars received initial news that an Ilkhanid army was marching toward al-Bira and immediately began mobilizing his forces. However, he initially hesitated to march north, remaining uncertain of the report's accuracy until 29 November, when he received definitive confirmation that the Mongol army had arrived at al-Bira and erected mangonels. The Sultan finally set out from Damascus on 8 December, which, according to the contemporary Mamluk chronicler Izz al-Din ibn Shaddad, was also the exact day the Mongols abandoned the siege and withdrew from the fortress.

Baybars received early reports of the retreat while still near Damascus, but remained skeptical of the information's veracity. He continued his march as far north as Homs, where he obtained verified reports confirming the retreat, before returning to Damascus. Historical and primary accounts attribute the short siege to severe environmental, logistical, and political factors. The besiegers suffered heavily from a severe lack of supplies, intense cold, and heavy snowfall, which resulted in the deaths of a large portion of their horses. Izz al-Din ibn Shaddad notes that the Mongol commanders discovered that the Pervane was secretly in talks with Baybars and suspected that their Seljuk allies intended to betray them on the battlefield. The siege was also failing because the fortress was well-defended, heavily stocked with provisions, and the Mamluk garrison had successfully launched an aggressive night sortie directly against the Mongol lines to destroy their mangonels. Facing high attrition, disease and poor equipment, the Mongol commanders ordered a full withdrawal, later using the lack of supplies and severe weather to justify the failure to Abaqa Khan.
