= Fall of Gibelacar =

Fall of Gibelacar (1271)
- Part of Crusades
Date	29 April – 11 May 1271
Location	Gibelacar
Result	Mamluk victory

Belligerents
County of Tripoli	Mamluk Sultanate

Commanders and leaders
Unknown	Sultan Baybars; Rukn al-din Mankür al-Dawadari †

The Fall of Gibelacar happened in the year 1271 when the Mamluk Sultan Baybars captured Gibelacar from the Crusaders of Tripoli after nine days of siege.

== Background ==
In the year 1271, the Mamluk Sultan launched his campaign against the Crusader states. The Mamluks captured Chastel Blanc from the Templars without resistance, allowing 700 garrison men to leave unharmed on January 24th. Next he managed to capture Krak des Chevaliers from the Hospitallers on April 8th. After these victories, the two military orders in Tripoli sued for peace, which the Mamluks granted. Next, Baybars set his eyes on the fort of Gibelacar. Located on the opposite side of the Homs-Tripoli divide from Krak des Chevaliers, Gibelacar is nestled in the ravines at the northern end of the Lebanese mountains. The fortress was under the suzerainty of the County of Tripoli at that time.

== Fall ==
On the 28th of April, the Sultan left Krak and went to Gibelacre. Arriving there on the next day, Baybars had difficulty transporting the large siege engines. It was necessary to cut down trees in the valley and improve the steep mountain paths by breaking up the rocks. On May 2nd, the siege engines were in place and began bombarding the castle. The Crusader garrison showed resistance, and on the same day, one of the emirs, Rukn al-din Mankür al-Dawadari, was killed by a projectile while he was praying in front of his tent. On May 4th, a breach was made in which the eastern wall collapsed; nevertheless, the siege lasted until May 11th. On that day, the crusaders demanded to capitulate and obtained permission to withdraw to Tripoli under the Sultan's protection which he granted them.

== Aftermath ==
After the capture, he sent a letter to Bohemond VI mocking him and advised him to escape Tripoli by sea. Leaving his baggage, the Sultan marched on the 16th of May to Tripoli; however, on his way there, he heard the news of the arrival of a new crusade in Acre. He made peace with Bohemond and marched there to deal with the new threat.

== Sources ==
- Peter Thorau (1993), The Lion of Egypt: Sultan Baybars I and the Near East in the thirteenth century.
- Michael Lower (2018). The Tunis Crusade of 1270: A Mediterranean History.
- Hugh Kennedy (1994), Crusader castles.
- Paul Deschamps (1973), The Crusader Castles in the Holy Land, Vol. III: The Defense of the County of Tripoli and the Principality of Antioch (In French).
