= Baybars =

Sultan of Egypt and Syria from 1260 to 1277

- Sultan Misr wa al-Sham; Al-Malik al-Zahir; Rukn al-Din
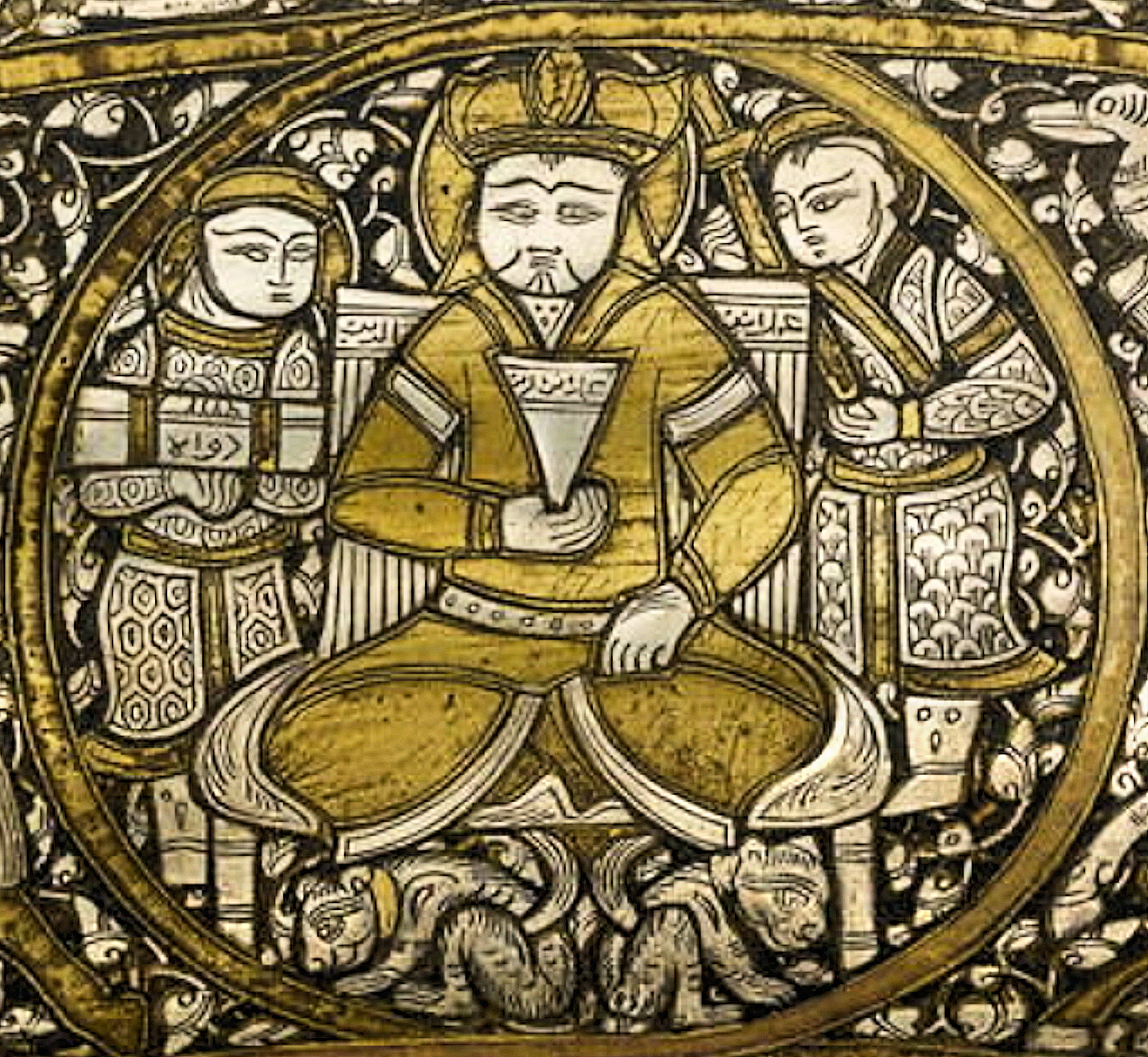
- A probable near-contemporary depiction of Sultan Baybars: enthroned ruler and attendants in the Baptistère de Saint Louis (1320–1340).

Sultan of Egypt and Syria
- Reign: 24 October 1260 – 30 June 1277
- Coronation: 1260 at Salihiyah
- Predecessor: Saif ad-Din Qutuz
- Successor: Al-Said Barakah
- Born: 19 July 1223 or 1228; Dasht-i Kipchak
- Died: 30 June 1277 (aged 50/55); Damascus, Mamluk Sultanate
- Burial: Zahiriyya Library, Damascus
- Consort: Iltutmish Khatun (likely a daughter born from a Khwarazmian Emir and a Daughter of Berke), Al-Karakiya
- Issue: Al-Said Barakah; Solamish; Khizir; Tidhkarbay Khatun
Names
- al-Malik al-Zahir Rukn al-Din Baybars al-Bunduqdari Abu al-Futuh
- House: Zahiri
- Dynasty: Bahri
- Religion: Islam
- Military career
- Conflicts: Seventh Crusade; Battle of Mansurah (1250); Battle of Fariskur (1250); Mongol invasions of the Levant; Battle of Ain Jalut; Lord Edward's Crusade; Siege of al-bira (1272); Battle of Elbistan; Crusader Campaigns: Siege of Caesarea Maritima (1265); Fall of Arsuf; Fall of Haifa (1265); Siege of Safed (1266); Fall of Jaffa (1268); Fall of Beaufort Castle (1268); Siege of Antioch (1268); Fall of Krak des Chevaliers; Fall of Gibelacar; Fall of Montfort Castle; Other campaigns; Battle of Mari; Battle of Dongola (1276)

Al-Malik al-Zahir Rukn al-Din Baybars al-Bunduqdari (Arabic: الْمَلِك الظَّاهِر رُكْن الدِّين بَيْبَرْس الْبُنْدُقْدَارِيّ; (Note: "King Baybars the Victorious, Pillar of the Faith, the Crossbowman") 1223/1228 – 30 June 1277), commonly known as Baibars or Baybars (بَيْبَرْس) and nicknamed Abu al-Futuh (أَبُو الْفُتُوح, lit. 'Father of Conquests'), was the fourth Mamluk sultan of Egypt and Syria, ruling from 1260 to 1277. He is noted for leading the vanguard of the Mamluk army that inflicted the first substantial defeat of the Mongols at the Battle of Ain Jalut, as well as his successful campaigns against the Crusaders. Through a combination of diplomacy and military action, he ushered in an age of Mamluk dominance in the Eastern Mediterranean.

Of Turkic Kipchak origin, Baybars was sold into slavery during the Mongol invasions and ultimately entered the service of Ayyubid sultan As-Salih Ayyub. He subsequently rose to become a prominent military leader in Egypt. In 1250, he was a commander of the Muslim forces that defeated and captured King Louis IX of France during the Seventh Crusade, and led the group of Mamluks that assassinated sultan Turanshah. Later, he played a significant role in the victory over the invading Mongol army at Ain Jalut and soon thereafter orchestrated the assassination of sultan Qutuz, seizing the throne for himself.

As sultan, Baybars set about asserting Mamluk authority in Syria. After securing the loyalty of Ayyubid emirs, he launched extensive campaigns against the Crusader states, culminating in the capture of Antioch in 1268. He continued to fend off threats from the Mongols by engaging with the Ilkhanate, while forging an alliance with the Golden Horde. In 1276, he launched an expedition into Nubia that concluded with the subjugation of Makuria.

== Name and appearance ==
In his native Turkic language, Baybars' name means "great panther" or "lord panther" (see also Wiktionary: bay "rich person, noble" + pars "leopard, panther").

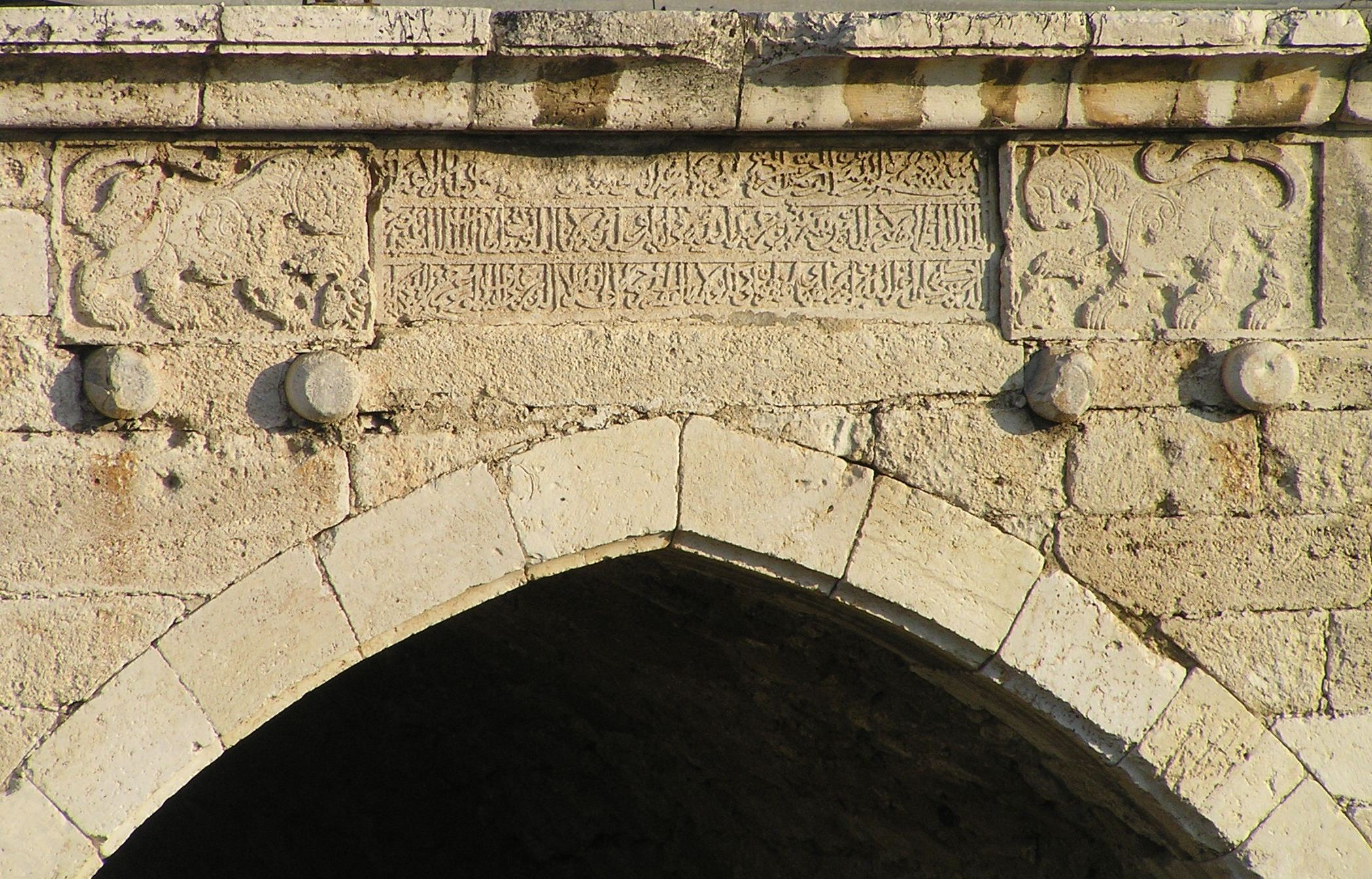
Bridge built by Baybars near modern Lod, with an inscription from 1273 glorifying the sultan and depicting his emblem, the lion/panther

Possibly based on the Turkic meaning of his name, Baybars used the panther as his heraldic blazon, and placed it on both coins and buildings. The lion/panther used on the bridge built by Baybars near al-Ludd (today's Lod) plays with a rat, which may be interpreted to represent Baybars' Crusader enemies.

Baybars was described as a tall man with olive skin and blue eyes. He had broad shoulders, slim legs, and a powerful voice. It was observed that he had cataract in one eye.

== Biography ==
Baybars was a Kipchak thought to be born in the steppe region north of the Black Sea, or Dasht-i Kipchak at the time. There is a discrepancy in Ibn Taghrībirdī's dating of his birth, since he says it took place in 625 AH (12 December 1227 – 29 November 1228) and also that Baybars was about 24 years old in 1247, which would put his birth closer to 1223. He belonged to the Barli tribe. According to a fellow Cuman and eyewitness, Badr al-Din Baysari, the Barli fled the armies of the Mongols, intending to settle in the Second Bulgarian Empire (named in the sources Wallachia). They crossed the Black Sea from either Crimea or Alania, where they had arrived in Bulgaria in about 1242. In the meantime, the Mongols invaded Bulgaria, including the regions where the Cuman refugees had recently settled. Both Baybars, who witnessed his parents being massacred, and Baysari were among the captives during the invasion and were sold into slavery in the Sultanate of Rum at the slave market in Sivas. Afterwards, he was sold in Hama to 'Alā' al-Dīn Īdīkīn al-Bunduqārī, an Egyptian of high rank, who brought him to Cairo. In 1247, al-Bunduqārī was arrested and the sultan of Egypt, As-Salih Ayyub, confiscated his slaves, including Baybars.

Al-Sha'rani (d. 973/1565) counted him among Ibn 'Arabi's students.

=== Rise to power ===
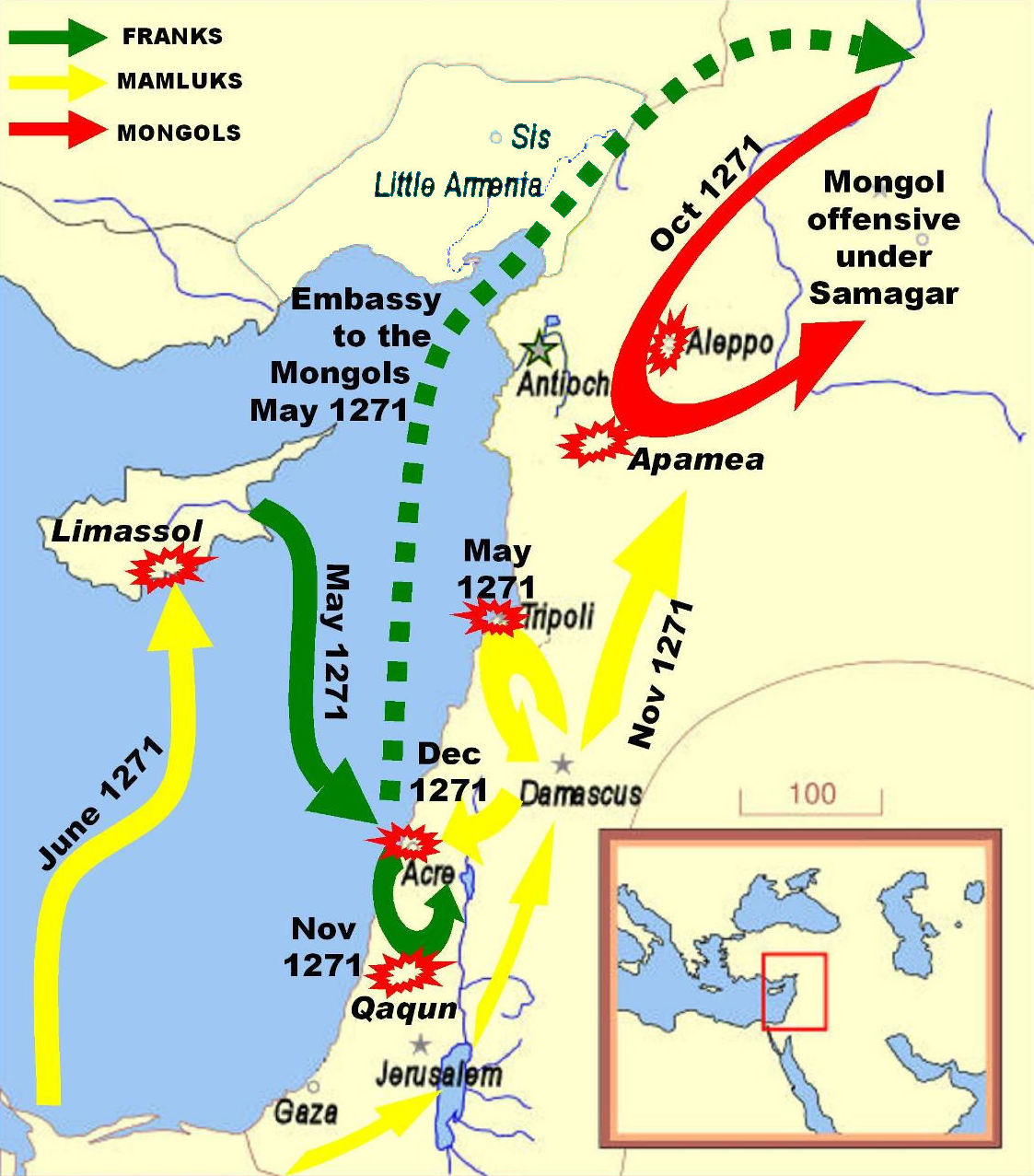
The Mamluks under Baybars (yellow) fought off the Franks and the Mongols during the Ninth Crusade.

In 1250, he supported the defeat of the Seventh Crusade of Louis IX of France in two major battles. The first was the Battle of Al Mansurah, where he employed an ingenious strategy in ordering the opening of a gate to let the crusader knights enter the town; the crusaders rushed into the town that they thought was deserted to find themselves trapped inside. They were besieged from all directions by the Egyptian forces and the town population, and suffered heavy losses. Robert of Artois, who took refuge in a house, and William Longespée the Younger were both killed, along with most of the Knights Templar. Only five Templar Knights escaped alive. The second was the Battle of Fariskur which essentially ended the Seventh Crusade and led to the capture of Louis IX. Egyptian forces in that battle were led by Sultan Turanshah, the young son of recently deceased as-Salih Ayyub. Shortly after the victory over the Crusaders, Baybars and a group of Mamluk soldiers assassinated Turanshah, leading to as-Salih Ayyub's widow Shajar al-Durr being named sultana.

In 1254, a power shift occurred in Egypt, as Aybak killed Faris ad-Din Aktai, the leader of the Bahri Mamluks. Some of his Mamluks, among them Baybars and Qalawun al-Alfi, fled to an-Nasir Yusuf in Syria, persuading him to break the accord and invade Egypt. Aybak wrote to an-Nassir Yusuf warning him of the danger of these Mamluks who took refuge in Syria, and agreed to grant him their territorial domains on the coast, but an-Nasir Yusuf refused to expel them and instead returned to them the domains which Aybak had granted. In 1255, an-Nasir Yusuf sent new forces to the Egyptian border, this time with many of Aktai's Mamluks, among them Baybars, and Qalawun al-Alfi, but he was defeated again. In 1257, Baybars and other Bahri Mamluks left Damascus to Jerusalem, where they deposed its governor Kütük and plundered its markets, then they did the same in Gaza. Later on, they fought against the forces of an-Nasir Yusuf at Nablus, then fled to join the forces of al-Mughith Umar in Kerak. The combined forces tried in vain to invade Egypt during the reign of Aybak.

Baybars then sent 'Ala al-Din Taybars al-Waziri to discuss with Qutuz his return to Egypt, which was eagerly accepted. He was still a commander under sultan Qutuz at the Battle of Ain Jalut in 1260, when he decisively defeated the Mongols. After the battle, Sultan Qutuz (aka Koetoez) was assassinated while on a hunting expedition. It was said that Baybars was involved in the assassination because he expected to be rewarded with the governorship of Aleppo for his military success, but Qutuz, fearing his ambition, refused to give him the post. Baybars succeeded Qutuz as Sultan of Egypt.

=== Becoming Sultan ===
Soon after Baybars had ascended to the Sultanate, his authority was confirmed without any serious resistance, except from Alam al-Din Sinjar al-Halabi, another Mamluk amir who was popular and powerful enough to claim Damascus. Also, the threat from the Mongols was still serious enough to be considered as a threat to Baybars' authority. However, Baybars first chose to deal with Sinjar, and marched on Damascus. At the same time the princes of Hama and Homs proved able to defeat the Mongols in the First Battle of Homs, which lifted the Mongol threat for a while. On 17 January 1261, Baybars's forces were able to rout the troops of Sinjar outside Damascus, and pursued the attack to the city, where the citizens were loyal to Sinjar and resisted Baybars, although their resistance was soon crushed.

There was also a brief rebellion in Cairo led by a leading figure of the Shiite named al-Kurani who is said originated from Nishapur. Al-Kurani and his follower are recorded to have attacked the weapon stores and stables of Cairo during a night raid. Baybars, however, manage to suppress the rebellion quickly as he surrounded and arrested them all. Al-Kurani and another rebel leaders were executed (crucified) in Bab Zuweila.

After suppressing the revolt of Sinjar, Baybars then managed to deal with the Ayyubids, while quietly eliminating the prince of Kerak. Ayyubids such as Al-Ashraf Musa, Emir of Homs and the Ayyubid Emir Dynasty of Hama Al-Mansur Muhammad II, who had earlier staved off the Mongol threat, were permitted to continue their rule in exchange for their recognizing Baybars' authority as Sultan.

After the Abbasid caliphate in Iraq was overthrown by the Mongols in 1258 when they conquered and sacked Baghdad, the Muslim world lacked a caliph, a theoretically supreme leader who had sometimes used his office to endow distant Muslim rulers with legitimacy by sending them writs of investiture. Thus, when the Abbasid refugee Abu al-Qasim Ahmad, the uncle of the last Abbasid caliph al-Musta'sim, arrived in Cairo in 1261, Baybars had him proclaimed caliph as al-Mustansir II and duly received investiture as sultan from him. Unfortunately, al-Mustansir II was killed by the Mongols during an ill-advised expedition to recapture Baghdad from the Mongols later in the same year. In 1262, another Abbasid, allegedly the great-great-great-grandson of the Caliph al-Mustarshid, Abu al-'Abbas Ahmad, who had survived from the defeated expedition, was proclaimed caliph as al-Hakim I, inaugurating the line of Abbasid caliphs of Cairo that continued as long as the Mamluk Sultanate, until 1517. Like his unfortunate predecessor, al-Hakim I also received the formal oath of allegiance of Baybars and provided him with legitimation. While most of the Muslim world did not take these caliphs seriously, as they were mere instruments of the sultans, they still lent a certain legitimation as well as a decorative element to their rule.

According to ʿIzz al-Dīn ibn Shaddād the Mongols tried to conquer Al-Bireh in 1264, after a brutal fight with the Mamluks and Sultan Baybars the mongols retreated beyond the euphrates.

==== Campaign against the Crusaders ====
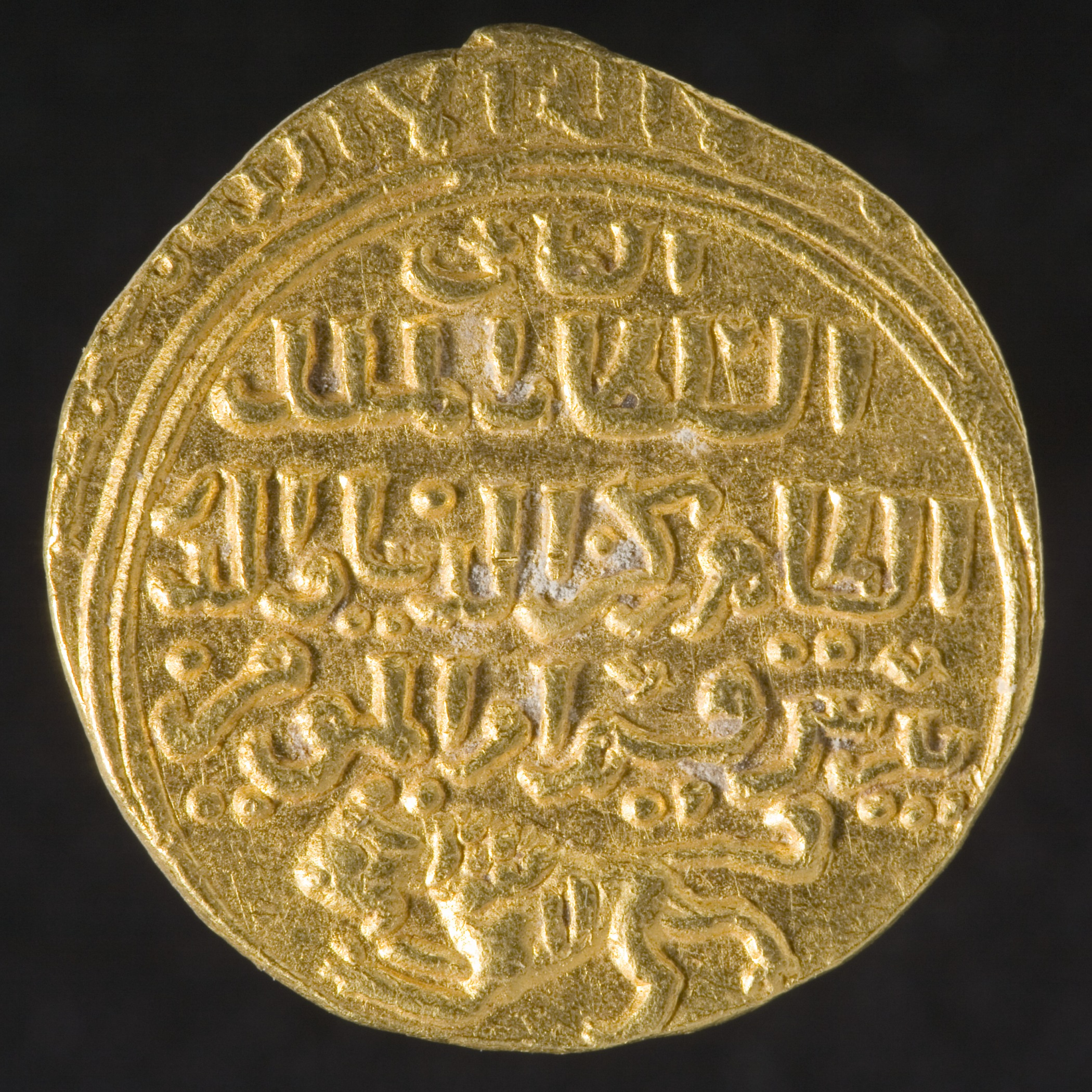
Gold coin minted under Baybars, with an Arabic inscription and an image of a panther or lion below it

As sultan, Baybars engaged in a lifelong struggle against the Crusader kingdoms in Syria, in part because the Christians had aided the Mongols. He started with the Principality of Antioch, which had become a vassal state of the Mongols and had participated in attacks against Islamic targets in Damascus and Syria. In 1263, Baybars laid siege to Acre, the capital of the remnant of the Kingdom of Jerusalem, although the siege was abandoned when he sacked Nazareth instead. He used siege engines to defeat the Crusaders in battles such as the Fall of Arsuf from 21 March to 30 April. After breaking into the town he offered free passage to the defending Knights Hospitallers if they surrendered their formidable citadel. The Knights accepted Baybars' offer but were enslaved anyway. Baybars razed the castle to the ground. He next attacked Atlit and Haifa, where he captured both towns after destroying the crusaders' resistance, and razed the citadels.

In the same year, Baybars laid siege to the fortress of Safed, held by the Templar knights, which had been conquered by Saladin in 1188 but returned to the Kingdom of Jerusalem in 1240. Baybars promised the knights safe passage to the Christian town of Acre if they surrendered their fortress. Badly outnumbered, the knights agreed. On capturing Safed, Baybars did not raze the fortress to the ground but fortified and repaired it instead, as it was strategically situated and well constructed. He installed a new governor in Safed, with the rank of Wali.

Later, in 1266, Baybars invaded the Christian country of Cilician Armenia which, under King Hethum I, had submitted to the Mongol Empire. After defeating the forces of Hethum I in the Battle of Mari, Baybars managed to ravage the three great cities of Mamistra, Adana and Tarsus, so that when Hetoum arrived with Mongol troops, the country was already devastated. Hetoum had to negotiate the return of his son Leo by giving control of Armenia's border fortresses to the Mamluks. In 1269, Hetoum abdicated in favour of his son and became a monk, but he died a year later. Leo was left in the awkward situation of keeping Cilicia as a subject of the Mongol Empire, while at the same time paying tribute to the Mamluks.

This isolated Antioch and Tripoli, led by Hethum's son-in-law, Prince Bohemond VI. After successfully conquering Cilicila, Baybars in 1267 settled his unfinished business with Acre, and continued the extermination of remaining crusader garrisons in the following years. In 1268, he besieged Antioch, capturing the city on 18 May. Baybars had promised to spare the lives of the inhabitants, but he broke his promise and had the city razed, killing or enslaving much of the population after the surrender. prompting the fall of the Principality of Antioch. The massacre of men, women, and children at Antioch "was the single greatest massacre of the entire crusading era." Priests had their throats slit inside their churches, and women were sold into slavery.

Then he continued to Jaffa, which belonged to Guy, the son of John of Ibelin. Jaffa fell to Baybars on 7 March after twelve hours of fighting; most of Jaffa's citizens were slain, but Baybars allowed the garrison to go unharmed. After this he conquered Ashkalon and Caesarea.

=== Further Ilkhanate attempt to attack the Mamluks ===
In 1272 the Mongol Ilkhanates attempted to besiege Al-Bira but failed when Sultan Baybars attacked the Mongols with a relief force of an unknown number, the Mongols tried to repel the attack, but they failed. After Mongol commander Samagar heard that the mongols have been defeated he retreated back into Mongol land.

==== Alliance with Golden Horde ====
Baybars actively pursued a close relationship with Berke, the Khan of Golden Horde. He particularly was recorded to receive the first two hundred soldiers from Golden Horde to visit warmly, where Baybars persuade them to convert to Islam while also observing the growing enmity between the Golden Horde Khan with Hulagu. Baybars, who at that time has just defeated Hulagu, immediately sent envoy to Berke to inform the latter about this. Then, As soon as Berke converted to Islam, he sent envoy to Egypt to give news about this matter, and later, Baybars brought more peoples from Golden Horde to be sent into Egypt, where they also converted to Islam.

In some time around October to November 1267, or about 666 Safar of Hijra year, Baybars wrote condolences and congratulations to the new Khan of the Golden Horde, Mengu-Timur, to urge him to fight Abaqa. Baybars continued to conduct warm correspondence with the Golden Horde, particularly with Mengu Timur's general Noqai, who unlike Mengu Timur was very cooperative with Baybars. It is theorized that this intimacy was not only due to the religious connection (as Noqai was a Muslim, unlike his Khan), but also because Noqai was not really fond of Mengu-Timur. However, Baybars was pragmatic in his approach and did not want to become involved in complicated intrigue inside the Golden Horde, so instead he stayed close to both Mengu Timur and Noqai.

==== Continued campaign against Crusaders ====
On 30 March 1271, after Baybars captured the smaller castles in the area, including Chastel Blanc, he besieged the Krak des Chevaliers, held by the Hospitallers. Peasants who lived in the area had fled to the castle for safety and were kept in the outer ward. As soon as Baybars arrived, he began erecting mangonels, powerful siege weapons which he would turn on the castle. According to Ibn Shaddad, two days later the first line of defences was captured by the besiegers; he was probably referring to a walled suburb outside the castle's entrance. After a lull of ten days, the besiegers conveyed a letter to the garrison, supposedly from the Grand Master of the Knights Hospitaller in Tripoli, Hugues de Revel, which granted permission for them to surrender. The garrison capitulated and the Sultan spared their lives. The new owners of the castle undertook repairs, focused mainly on the outer ward. The Hospitaller chapel was converted to a mosque and two mihrabs were added to the interior.

Baibars led a campaign against the Assassins. In 1271, Baibars' forces seized al-'Ullaiqah and ar-Rusafa, after taking Masyaf the year before. Later in the year, Shams ad-Din surrendered and was deported to Egypt. Qala'at al-Khawabi fell that year and within two years Gerdkuh and all of the Assassin fortresses were held by the sultan. With the Assassins under his control, Baibars was able to use them to counter the forces arriving in the Ninth Crusade.

Baybars then turned his attention to Tripoli, but he interrupted his siege there to call a truce in May 1271. The fall of Antioch had led to the brief Ninth Crusade, led by Prince Edward of England, who arrived in Acre in May 1271 and attempted to ally himself with the Mongols against Baybars. So Baybars declared a truce with Tripoli, as well as with Edward, who was never able to capture any territory from Baybars anyway. According to some reports, Baybars tried to have Edward assassinated with poison, but Edward survived the attempt and returned home in 1272 following the failure of the crusade.

==== Campaign against Makuria ====
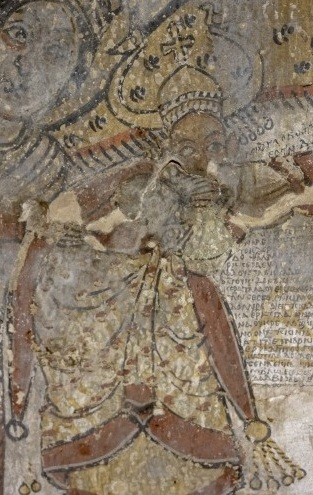
Possible depiction of king David of Makuria on a wallpainting from Old Dongola

In 1265 a Mamluk army allegedly raided Makuria as far south as Dongola while also expanding southwards along the African Red Sea coast, thus threatening the Nubians. In 1272 king David marched east and attacked the port town of Aidhab, located on an important pilgrimage route to Mecca. The Nubian army destroyed the town, causing “a blow to the very heart of Islam”. This initiated several decades of intervention by the Mamluks in Nubian affairs. A punitive Mamluk expedition was sent in response, but did not pass beyond the second cataract. Three years later the Makurians attacked and destroyed Aswan, but this time, Baybars responded with a well-equipped army setting off from Cairo in early 1276, accompanied by a cousin of king David named Mashkouda or Shekanda. The Mamluks defeated the Nubians in three battles at Gebel Adda, Meinarti and finally at the Battle of Dongola. David fled upstream the Nile, eventually entering al-Abwab in the south, which, previously being Alodia's northernmost province, had by this period become a kingdom of its own. The king of al-Abwab, however, handed David over to Baybars, who had him executed.

Baybars then completed his conquest of Nubia, including the Medieval lower Nubia which was ruled by Banu Kanz. Under the terms of the settlement, the Nubians were now subjected to paying jizya tribute, and in return they were allowed to keep their religion, being protected under Islamic law as 'People of the Book'; they were also allowed to continue being governed by a king from the native royal family, although this king was chosen personally by Baybars, namely a Makurian noble named Shakanda. In practice this was reducing Makuria to a vassal kingdom, effectively ending Makuria's status as an independent kingdom.

==== Further campaign against Ilkhanate ====
In 1277, Baybars invaded the Seljuq Sultanate of Rûm, then controlled by the Ilkhanate Mongols. He defeated a Ilkhanate army at the Battle of Elbistan Baybars himself went with a few troops to deal with the Mongol right flank that was pounding his left wing. Baybars ordered a force from the army from Hama to reinforce his left. The large Mamluk numbers were able to overwhelm the Mongol force, who instead of retreating dismounted from their horses. Some Mongols were able to escape and took up positions on the hills. Once they became surrounded they once again dismounted, and fought to the death. During the celebration of victory, Baybars said that "How can I be happy? Before I had thought that I and my servants would defeat the Mongols, but my left wing was beaten by them. Only Allah helped us".

The possibility of a new Mongol army convinced Baybars to return to Syria, since he was far away from his bases and supply line. As the Mamluk army returned to Syria the commander of the Mamluk vanguard, Izz al-Din Aybeg al-Shaykhi, deserted to the Mongols. Pervâne sent a letter to Baybars asking him to delay his departure. Baybars chastised him for not aiding him during the Battle of Elbistan. Baybars told him he was leaving for Sivas to mislead Pervâne and the Mongols as to his true destination. Baybars also sent Taybars al-Waziri with a force to raid the Armenian town of al-Rummana, whose inhabitants had hidden the Mongols earlier.

=== Death ===
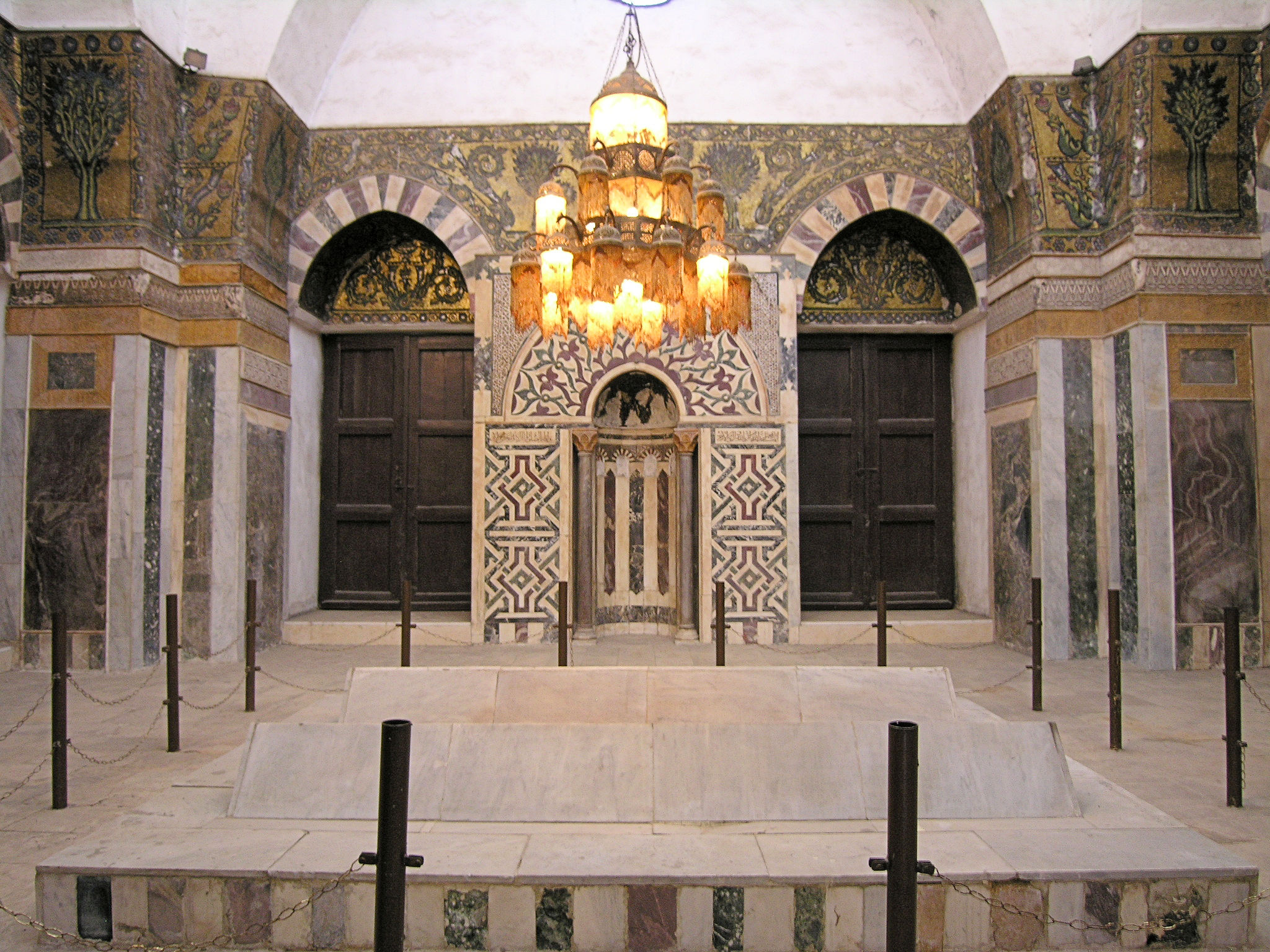
Mausoleum chamber of sultan Baybars (1260-1277) in Al-Zahiriyah Library in Damascus

Baybars died in Damascus on 30 June 1277, when he was 53 years old. His demise has been the subject of some academic speculation. Many sources agree that he died from drinking poisoned kumis that was intended for someone else. Other accounts suggest that he may have died from a wound while campaigning, or from illness. He was buried in the Az-Zahiriyah Library in Damascus.

== Family ==
Sultan Baybars married a noble lady from Tripoli (modern-day Lebanon) named Aisha al Bushnatiya, a prominent Arab family. Aisha was a warrior who fought the Crusaders along with her brother lieutenant Hassan. She met Sultan Baybars after he camped in Tripoli during his siege. They had a short relationship and after that they got married. There are conflicting stories of whether Aisha returned with Baybars to Egypt or was martyred in Tripoli.

One of Baibar's wives was the daughter of Amir Sayf ad-Din Nogay at-Tatari. Another wife was the daughter of Amir Sayf ad-Din Giray at-Tatari. Another wife was the daughter of Amir Sayf ad-Din Tammaji. Another wife was Iltutmish Khatun. She was the daughter of Barka Khan a former Khwarazmian amir. She was the mother of his son Al-Said Barakah. She died in 1284–85. Another wife was the daughter Karmun Agha, a Mongol Amir. He had three sons al-Said Barakah, Solamish and Khizir. He had seven daughters; one of them was named Tidhkarbay Khatun.

== Legacy ==
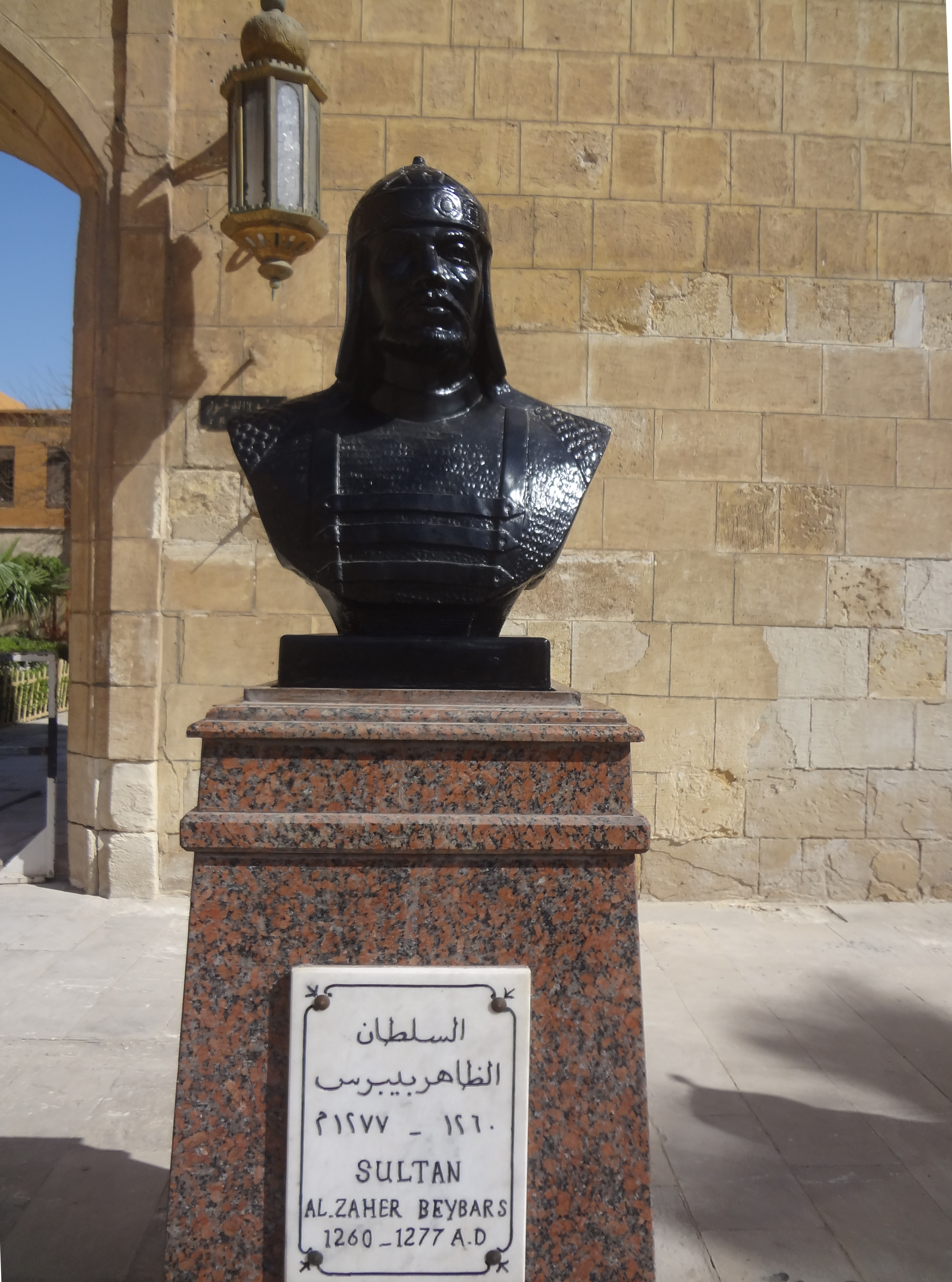
Bronze bust of Sultan Baibars in Cairo, at the Egyptian National Military Museum

As the first Sultan of the Bahri Mamluk dynasty, Baybars made the meritocratic ascent up the ranks of Mamluk society, where he commanded Mamluk forces in the decisive Battle of Ain Jalut in 1260, repelling Mongol forces from Syria. Although in the Muslim world he has been considered a national hero for centuries, and in the Near East and Kazakhstan is still regarded as such, Baybars was reviled in the Christian world of the time for his successful campaigns against the Crusader States.

Baybars also played an important role in bringing the Mongols to Islam. He developed strong ties with the Mongols of the Golden Horde and took steps for the Golden Horde Mongols to travel to Egypt. The arrival of the Mongol's Golden Horde to Egypt resulted in a significant number of Mongols accepting Islam.

=== Military legacy ===
Baybars was a popular ruler in the Muslim world who had defeated the crusaders in three campaigns, and the Mongols in the Battle of Ain Jalut which many scholars deem of great macro-historical importance. In order to support his military campaigns, Baybars commissioned arsenals, warships and cargo vessels. He was also arguably the first to employ explosive hand cannons in war, at the Battle of Ain Jalut. However this claim of hand cannons usage is disputed by other historians who claim hand cannons did not appear in the Middle East until the 14th century. His military campaign also extended into Libya and Nubia.

=== Culture and science ===
He was also an efficient administrator who took interest in building various infrastructure projects, such as a mounted message relay system capable of delivery from Cairo to Damascus in four days. He built bridges, irrigation and shipping canals, improved the harbours, and built mosques. He was a patron of Islamic science, such as his support for the medical research of his Arab physician, Ibn al-Nafis. As a testament of a special relationship between Islam and cats, Baybars left a cat garden in Cairo as a waqf, providing the cats of Cairo with food and shelter.

His memoirs were recorded in Sirat al-Zahir Baibars ("Life of al-Zahir Baibars"), a popular Arabic romance recording his battles and achievements. He has a heroic status in Kazakhstan, as well as in Egypt, Palestine, Lebanon and Syria.

Al-Madrassa al-Zahiriyya is the school built adjacent to his Mausoleum in Damascus. The Az-Zahiriyah Library has a wealth of manuscripts in various branches of knowledge to this day.

== See also ==
- Ablaq
- Bahri dynasty
- Cumania
- Cuman people
- Kipchak people
- Mosque of al-Zahir Baybars
- Sirat al-Zahir Baibars
- Sayyidah Zainab District

== Notes ==
Baybars Bahri dynasty Cadet branch of the Mamluk Sultanate Born: 19 July 1223 Died: 1 July 1277
Regnal titles
Preceded by Saif ad-Din Qutuz	Sultan of Egypt and Syria; 24 October 1260 – 1 July 1277	Succeeded by Al-Said Barakah
