= Fall of Haifa =

Fall of Haifa may refer to:

- Siege of Haifa (1100), capture of the town by the First Crusade
- Fall of Haifa (1265), capture of the town by the Mamluks
- Battle of Haifa (1918), capture of the town by the Allies during World War I
- Battle of Haifa (1948), capture of the town by Jewish forces

== See also ==
- Battle of Haifa
