= Siege of Caesarea Maritima (1265) =

Battle in the later Crusades

Fall of Caesarea Maritima (1265)
- Part of The Crusades
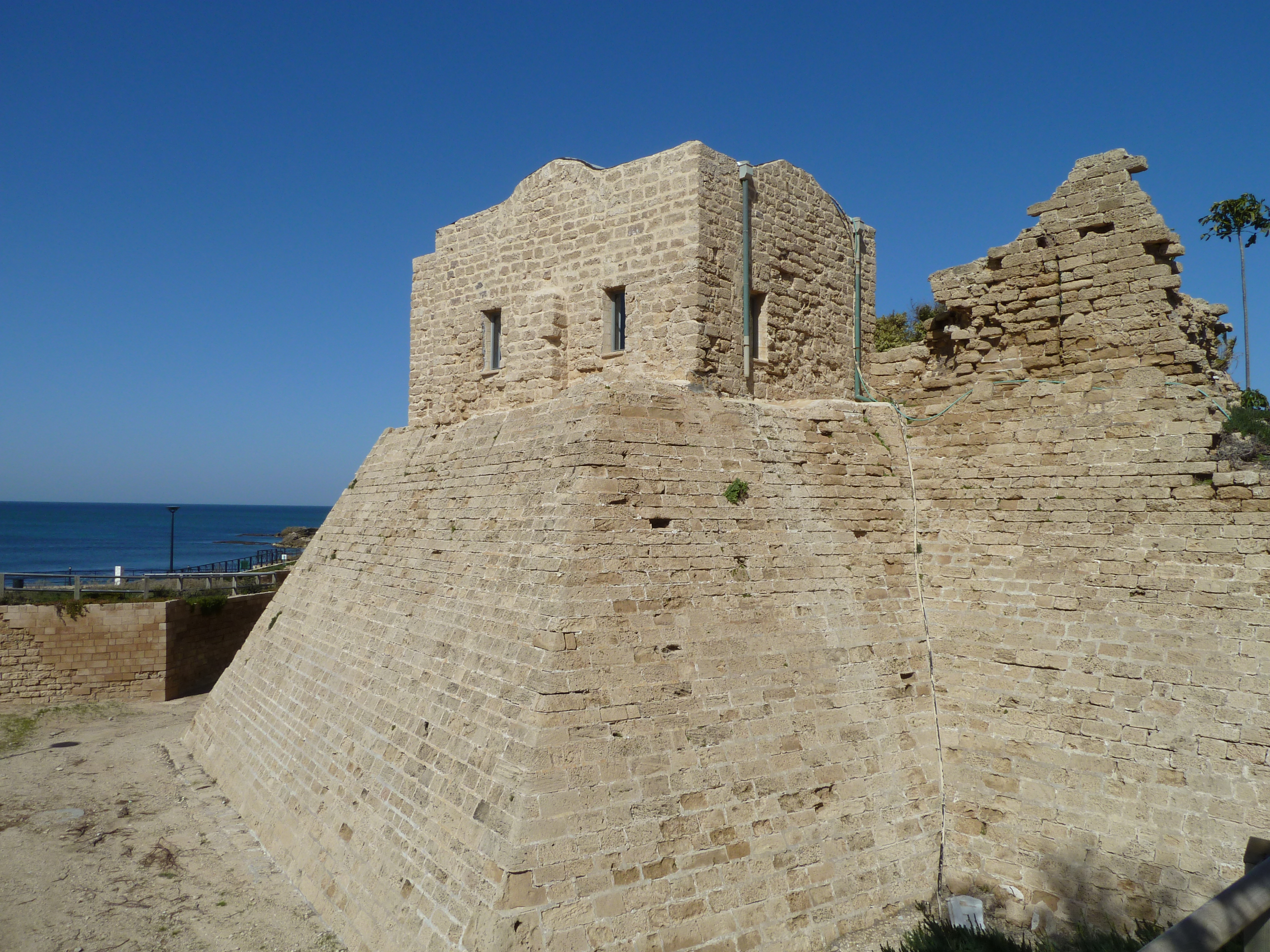
- Caesarea Crusader walls
| Date | 27 February – 5 March 1265 |
| Location | Caesarea Maritima |
| Result | Mamluk victory |

Belligerents
| Mamluk Sultanate | Kingdom of Jerusalem |

Commanders and leaders
| Baibars | Unknown |

Strength
| 5 catapults | Unknown |

Casualties and losses
| Unknown | Unknown |

The Siege of Caesarea Maritima took place in 1265. The Crusader fortress Caesarea Maritima fell to the Mamluks led by Sultan Baybars after a one-week siege. Baybars then demolished the fortress.

== Background ==
When Baybars ascended to the throne, he inherited a long truce between the Mamluks and the Kingdom of Jerusalem. When the truce expired in 1265, Baybars chose not to extend it. Earlier, Hulegu Khan and Louis IX of France had diplomatic talks regarding a joint attack on the Mamluks. Baybars was determined to crush the weakest party in this potential coalition, which was the Levantine Crusaders. Baybars began his campaign against the two Crusader coastal fortresses: Caesarea Maritima and Arsuf. Baybars began cutting wood for siege engines and declared Jihad. Baybars had 5 catapults.

== Fall ==
On February 27th, the Mamluks appeared at the gates of Caesarea without any warning. The Mamluks were able to capture the walls without ladders. The defenders retreated to the citadel, hoping its strong walls, as fortified by Louis IX, would protect them. The Mamluks began bombarding the citadel with stones and Greek fire from catapults. Baybars participated in the fighting, climbing to the top of a church tower and launching arrows at those who exposed themselves. Meanwhile, the Mamluk light cavalry was outside, ready to intercept any Crusader relief force; however, none came. With no help arriving, the Crusaders evacuated using rescue boats on March 5.

== Aftermath ==
Baybars ordered the destruction of the city and its citadel, as he planned to make them unusable since the Crusaders possessed naval supremacy. Baybars continued his campaign; the nearby town of Haifa surrendered. On March 19, Baybars attacked Arsuf.

== Sources ==
- Jones, Dan (2019). "Crusaders, The Epic History of the Wars for the Holy Lands".
- Crowley, Roger (2019). "Accursed Tower, The Crusaders' Last Battle for the Holy Land".
- Hillenbrand, Carole (2018). "The Crusades: Islamic Perspectives".
