= Battle of Dongola (1276) =

Battle between Mamluk Sultanate and Kingdom of Makuria in Nubia

Date	1276
Location	Dongola, in Makuria (Sudan)
Result	Mamluk victory

Belligerents
Kingdom of Makuria	Mamluk Sultanate; Banu Kanz; Bedouin auxilairies; Arab tribes of Sudan

Commanders and leaders
David of Makuria	Baybars

Strength
Unknown	Unknown

Casualties and losses
10,000 captured; many killed	Unknown

The Battle of Dongola (1276) was fought between the Mamluk Sultanate under Baybars and the Kingdom of Makuria. The Mamluks achieved a decisive victory, capturing the Makurian capital Dongola, forcing the king David of Makuria to flee and placing a puppet on the Makurian throne. After this battle the Kingdom of Makuria went into a period of decline until its collapse in the 15th century.

== Background ==
The Baqt was an agreement between the Muslim rulers of Egypt and the Christian rulers of Makuria which had guaranteed peace between the two opposing groups for over 600 years at this point and is in many ways the longest lasting treaty in history. The treaty greatly benefitted the Makurians, who gained friendly relations with a powerful neighbour, with the main drawback being that they were required to send 360 slaves a year to Egypt, which was later negotiated down so the payment was only made every 3 years. However the treaty never fully stopped conflict and small scale raiding often occurred between both sides

The exact reasons for the breakout of war between Makurian king David and Egyptian sultan Baibars are not known but was most likely a simple unwillingness by David to pay the Baqt to the upstart Mamluk state, as the Mamluks had only came to power in 1250 and were seemingly not viewed favourably by David. There is also evidence raids between the two sides had been occurring for a few years before the reigns of both Baibars and David. This already strained relationship was likely not helped by the arrival of Shekenda, a Makurian prince with a claim to David’s throne, in the Mamluk court. These factors would lead the two states to full scale war, which started in 1272 as the Makurians sacked the Egyptian town of Aidhab. This was followed by a Makurian raid on Aswan in 1275.

== Battle ==
In 1276 Sultan Baibars led a campaign into Nubia and fought David of Makuria in a series of battles that culminated in Makuria's defeat at their capital of Dongola. Very little details about the engagement are known but it was a heavy defeat for the Makurian army. David was forced to flee and Dongola fell. Baibars placed Shekenda on the throne where he would rule as a Mamluk vassal. The battle signified the beginning of the end for Makuria as the state would slowly shrink in territory over the coming century in the face of increased aggression from its Muslim neighbours, eventually disappearing altogether in the 15th century.
