= Fall of Beaufort Castle (1268) =

Mamluk victory over the Templars in Lebanon

Coordinates: 33.3243°N 35.5321°E

- Part of Crusades
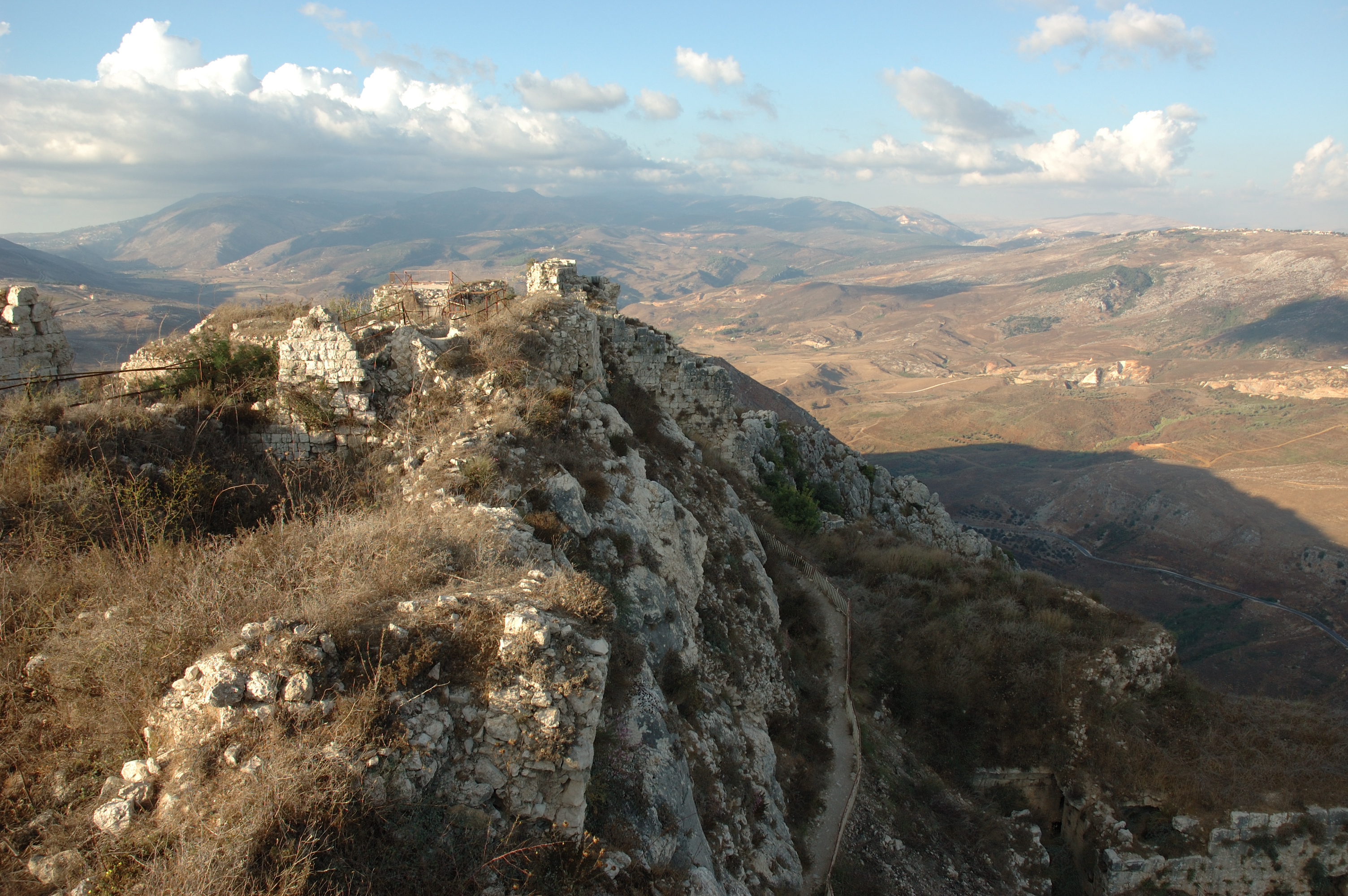
- Beaufort Castle view
Date	4–15 April 1268
Location	Beaufort Castle, Lebanon
Result	Mamluk victory

Belligerents
Knights Templar	Mamluk Sultanate

Commanders and leaders
Unknown	Baybars

Strength
480 Templars; 1 catapult	26 Trebuchets

Casualties and losses
All Templars enslaved	Unknown

The Fall of Beaufort Castle happened in 1268 when the Mamluk Sultan Baybars besieged the Templar fortress of Beaufort. After more than a week of siege, the fortress surrendered to the Mamluks.

== Background ==
In the early year of 1268, the Mamluk Sultan Baybars had learned of Mongol plans to raid Aleppo. He gathered his forces and marched to Gaza on February 16. The Mongol threat, however, was a pretext he used to fool the Crusaders into thinking they were not the target of his campaign. Before leaving Cairo, Baybars sent messages to this military commander in Damascus to mobilize his forces and bring them to Banias. Another message was sent to another commander to prepare his forces for an attack on Beaufort Castle but to take no action until he arrives. Baybars managed to capture Jaffa on March 7. Afterwards, he marched to Beaufort.

== Fall ==
Baybars arrived in Beaufort on April 4. His forces from Damascus had already prepared 2 siege engines, and in total 26 were prepared a few days later. The siege engines were used on the western side of the castle. Beaufort had two citadels. A second citadel was originally built to deprive level ground to any besiegers. This did not have the desired effect. The Templars were not able to defend it more than a week after the Sultan's arrival and abandoned it on the night of the 10th-11th, burning everything they could not carry. In the following, the Mamluks occupied the citadel and moved some of their trebuchets. They began bombarding the castle on April 12.

The Templars had one siege engine, which they used to shoot back at the Mamluks. Over the following days, the bombardment terrified the garrison, causing them to quarrel with each other after the Mamluks intercepted one of their letters. The castle had many non-combatants who couldn't escape before the siege. Seeing nothing could be done, the Templars surrendered on the condition they would allow women and children a safe passage to Tyre. Baybars agreed, and the garrison, numbering 480 men, was enslaved. The castle fell on the 15th. Baybars demolished the outer citadel and kept the castle for Mamluk usage.

== Aftermath ==
After the fall of Beaufort, Baybars led his men on a difficult march through the mountains of Lebanon; they began plundering the lands of Tripoli, and from there they marched and captured Antioch, ending the Principality of Antioch forever.

== Sources ==
- Michael Lower (2018), The Tunis Crusade of 1270: A Mediterranean History.
- Michael S. Fulton (2018), Artillery in the Era of the Crusades, Siege Warfare and the Development of Trebuchet Technology.
