= Fall of Jaffa (1268) =

Siege in the later Crusades

- Part of The Crusades
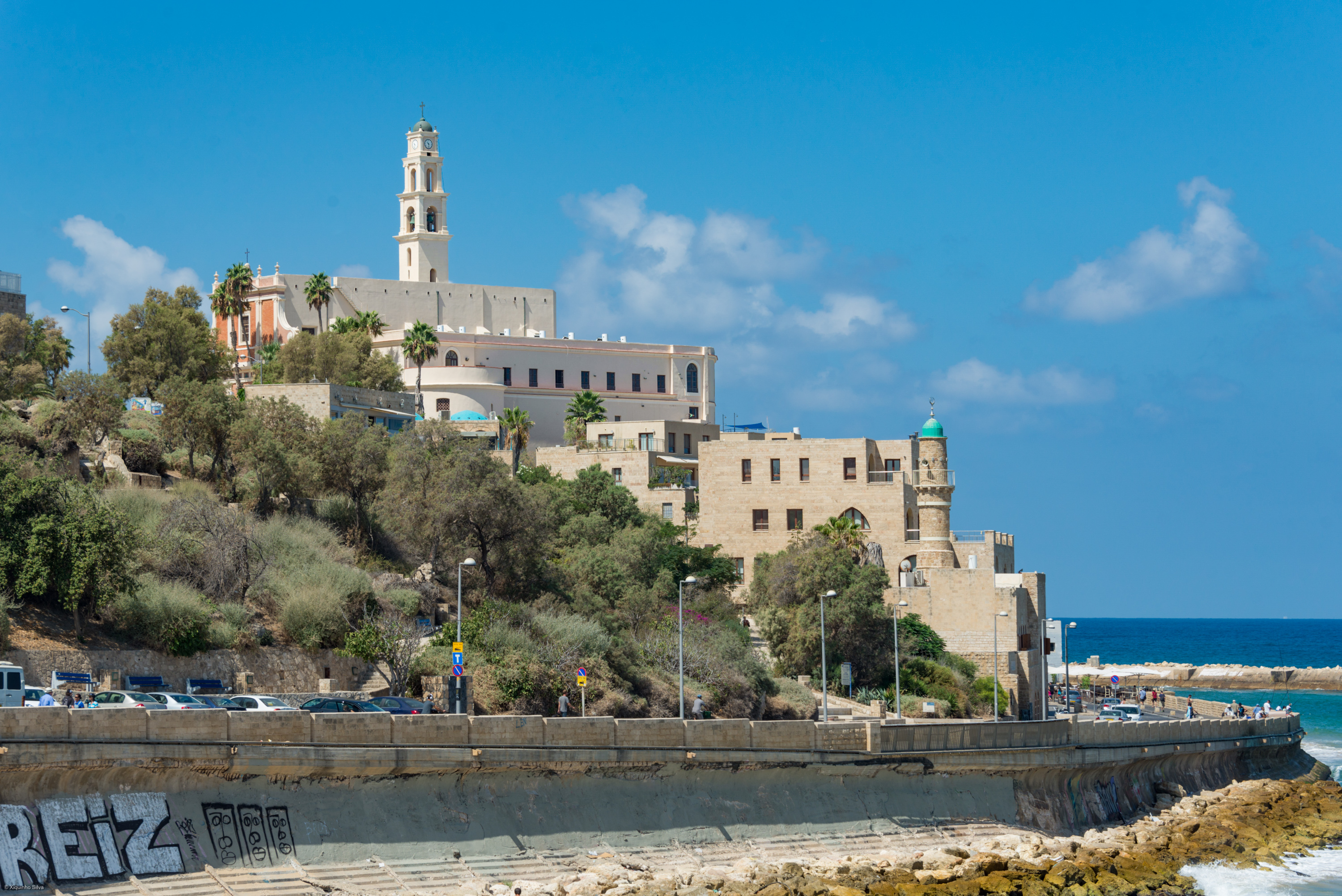
Date	7 March 1268
Location	Jaffa
Result	Mamluk victory

Belligerents
Kingdom of Jerusalem	Mamluk Sultanate

Commanders and leaders
Guy of Ibelin (surrendered)	Baibars

Strength
Unknown	Unknown

Casualties and losses
Heavy	Unknown

The Fall of Jaffa in 1268 happened between the Crusader garrison of Jaffa and a Mamluk army led by Baybars. The Mamluks were victorious and demolished Jaffa, ending the Crusader presence there.

== Background ==
In the early year of 1268, the Mamluk Sultan Baybars had learned of Mongol plans to raid Aleppo. He gathered his forces and marched to Gaza on February 16. The Mongol threat however was a pretext he used to fool the Crusaders thinking they were not the target of his campaign. Before leaving Cairo, Baybars sent messages to this military commander in Damascus to mobilize his forces and bring them to Banias. Another message was sent to another commander to prepare his forces for an attack on Beaufort Castle but to take no action until he arrives. Baybars then marched from Gaza to Jaffa. Jaffa once belonged to John of Ibelin. Baybars had a truce with him. After John passed away, his son, Guy of Ibelin succeeded him. Baybars saw that the truce did not extend to his son and decided to attack Jaffa.

== Fall ==
On March 7, the Mamluks arrived to Jaffa. They quickly surrounded the castle and stormed its gates, successfully opening it for the rest of the army to enter. The Crusaders were taken by surprise and unprepared for fighting. The Mamluks slaughtered many of the garrison as well as its inhabitants. After 12 hours of fighting the survivors retreated to the citadel there which was rebuilt by Louis IX of France. Seeing that they lost, the survivors surrendered to the Sultan. Baybars gave them safe passage to Acre. The Mamluks then proceed to demolish its citadel. As part of the spoils captured, several woods and marble of the citadel were sent to Cairo for a new upcoming mosque built by Baybars. The Sultan allegedly had the relic of the head of Saint George and burned the body of St Christine The loss of Jaffa marked the end of Crusader presence in south of Palestine.

== Sources ==
- Jaroslav Folda (2005), Crusader art in the Holy Land : from the Third Crusade to the fall of Acre, 1187–1291.
- Michael Lower (2018), The Tunis Crusade of 1270, A Mediterranean History.
- Steven Runcimen (1954), A History Of The Crusades Vol-III.
