= Fall of Haifa (1265) =

Successful Mamluk siege against the Crusaders

- Part of The Crusades
Date	March 1265
Location	Haifa
Result	Mamluk victory

Belligerents
Mamluk Sultanate	Kingdom of Jerusalem

Commanders and leaders
Baibars	Unknown

In the year 1265, the Mamluk Sultan Baibars captured Caesarea Maritima on March 5. A few days later, Baibars dispatched a force to capture Haifa from the Crusaders. The inhabitants of Haifa were warned of the Mamluk approach in time and quickly evacuated to their ships, abandoning the town and citadel. The Mamluks easily captured the town and began demolishing it alongside its citadel.
