= Fall of Krak des Chevaliers =

Capture of castle in 1271

Coordinates: 34.757°N 36.295°E

- Part of The Crusades
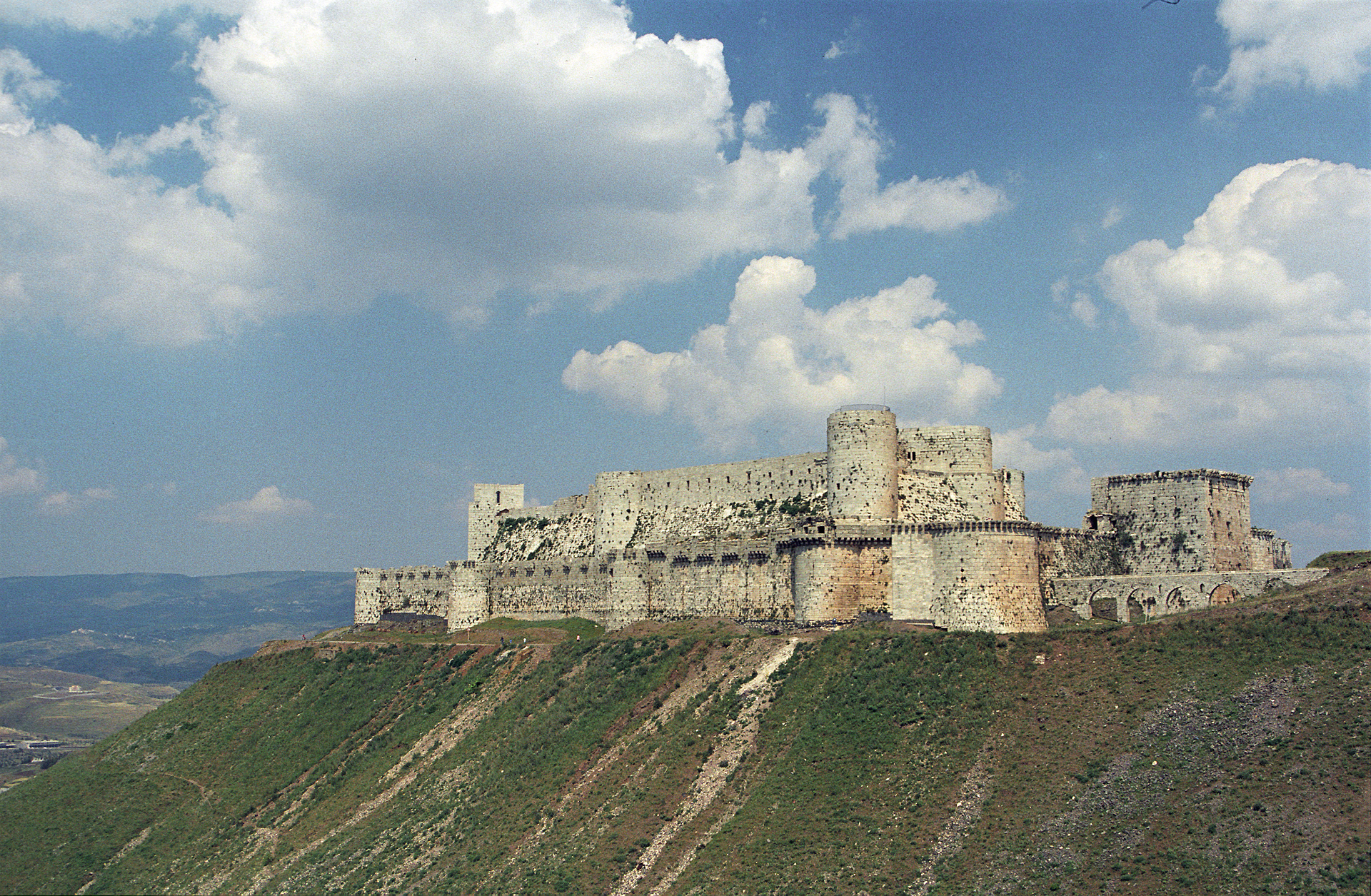
- The Krak des Chevaliers
Date	3 March – 8 April 1271
Location	Krak des Chevaliers
Result	Mamluk victory

Belligerents
Mamluk Sultanate of Egypt	Knights Hospitaller

Commanders and leaders
Baybars	Jean de Villiers

Strength
Unknown	Unknown

Casualties and losses
Unknown	Unknown

The Crusader fortress of Krak des Chevaliers fell to the Egyptian Mamluk sultan Baybars in 1271. Baybars went north to deal with Krak des Chevaliers after the death of Louis IX of France on 29 November 1270.

== Background ==
By the mid-13th century, the political and military landscape of the region had shifted dramatically. The Crusader states, weakened by decades of warfare, internal division, and loss of territory, had become increasingly isolated. Meanwhile, the Mamluks, having established their rule over Egypt and Syria, emerged as the dominant Muslim power, resolutely committed to reclaiming lands from the Crusaders.

== Prelude ==
=== Architecture ===
The fortress was constructed as a concentric castle, a design that features two principal defensive layers: an inner stronghold (the "donjon" or keep) and a formidable outer enceinte (curtain wall), separated by a broad, stone-paved passage. The outer wall is irregularly polygonal, adapting to the hilltop, and is studded with massive, semi-circular towers that project outward, allowing defenders to cover all approaches with flanking fire. These towers are multi-storied, with lower chambers often used for storage and upper floors equipped with arrow slits and machicolations for archers and defenders. Access to the Krak is via a single, heavily fortified entrance on the east, approached by a sloping ramp and protected by a complex sequence of defensive features. Attackers had passed through a series of gates, each set at an angle to the last—creating a bent entrance that inhibits the use of rams and prevents a direct charge. The entrance is further shielded by a barbican and defended from above by murder holes and arrow slits.

Within the enclosure, the inner castle is a compact, almost rectangular structure, rising above the outer wall. Its walls are even thicker, often exceeding four meters, and reinforced with their own round towers. The keep houses the principal residential and administrative quarters, including the knights' dormitories, a grand hall with rib-vaulted ceilings, storerooms, and a chapel. The chapel, located on the southern side of the inner court, is built in the Romanesque style, with a barrel-vaulted nave and a semi-circular apse. The inner ward also contains extensive service areas: kitchens, bakeries, stables, and cisterns for storing water collected from rain and an ingenious aqueduct system. The castle’s provisions allowed it to withstand sieges for months, if not years. Narrow, winding staircases link the various levels and towers, often built within the thickness of the walls themselves, allowed defenders to move unseen and protected. Krak des Chevaliers was further protected by a broad moat cut into the bedrock, which at one time could be flooded. Beyond the moat, the slopes were kept clear of vegetation to deny attackers any cover.

== Siege and surrender ==
After beating back the Mongols across the Euphrates, the Mamluk sultan Baybars was determined to oust the Crusaders from the Holy Land and bring it under Muslim Mamluk control. Before marching on the castle, Baybars captured the smaller castles in the area, including Chastel Blanc. On 3 March 1271, Baybars' army arrived at Krak des Chevaliers. By the time the Sultan arrived the castle may already have been blockaded by Mamluk forces for several days. There are three Arabic accounts of the siege; only one, that of Ibn Shaddad, was by a contemporary although he was not present. Peasants who lived in the area had fled to the castle for safety and were kept in the outer ward. As soon as Baybars arrived he began erecting mangonels, powerful siege weapons which he would turn on the castle. According to Ibn Shaddad, two days later the first line of defences was captured by the besiegers; he was probably referring to a walled suburb outside the castle's entrance.

Rain interrupted the siege, but on 21 March a triangular outwork immediately south of Krak des Chevaliers, possibly defended by a timber palisade, was captured. On 29 March, the tower in the south-west corner was undermined and collapsed. Baybars' army attacked through the breach and on entering the outer ward where they encountered the peasants who had sought refuge in the castle.

Though the outer ward had fallen, and in the process a handful of the garrison killed, the Crusaders retreated to the more formidable inner ward. After a lull of ten days, the besiegers conveyed a letter to the garrison, supposedly from the Grand Master of the Knights Hospitaller in Tripoli which granted permission for them to surrender. Although the letter was a forgery, the garrison capitulated and the Sultan spared their lives. The new owners of the castle undertook repairs, focused mainly on the outer ward. The Hospitaller chapel was converted to a mosque and two mihrabs were added to the interior.

== Bibliography ==
- Hogg, Ian (1981). The history of fortification. New York City: St. Martin's Press. ISBN 978-0-312-37852-3.
- Kennedy, Hugh (1994), Crusader Castles, Cambridge: Cambridge University Press, ISBN 0-521-42068-7
- King, D. J. Cathcart (1949), "The Taking of Le Krak des Chevaliers in 1271", Antiquity, 23 (90): 83–92, doi:10.1017/S0003598X0002007X, S2CID 164061795
- Folda, Jaroslav; French, Pamela; Coupel, Pierre (1982), "Crusader Frescoes at Crac des Chevaliers and Marqab Castle", Dumbarton Oaks Papers, 36, Dumbarton Oaks, Trustees for Harvard University: 177–210, doi:10.2307/1291467, JSTOR 1291467
- Irwin, Robert; et al. (New Cambridge Medieval History) (1999). "The rise of the Mamluks". c.1198-c.1300. Vol. 5. Cambridge: Cambridge University Press. ISBN 0-521-36289-X.
- Housley, Norman; et al. (New Cambridge Medieval History) (1999). "The thirteenth-century crusades in the Mediterranean". c.1198-c.1300. Vol. 5. Cambridge: Cambridge University Press. ISBN 0-521-36289-X.
