= Battle of Haifa =

Battle of Haifa may refer to:

- Battle of Haifa (1918), a battle of World War I
- Battle of Haifa (1948), part of the 1948 Palestine war
- Battle of Haifa Street, a battle of the Iraq War

== See also ==
- Fall of Haifa
