= White Wallachia =

Former Byzantine theme of Bulgaria

Modern historians assert that the name Vlachia, Asen's Wallachia, or White Wallachia was more likely applied to the former Byzantine theme of Bulgaria.

White Wallachia (Greek: Ασπροβλαχία, romanized: Asprovlachía), sometimes referred to simply as Vlachia, Wallachia or Asen's Wallachia by Western sources, was a rarely used Byzantine term for the territory corresponding to modern day Bulgaria during the Asen dynasty.

Starting in 1185, the Bulgarians and Vlachs living in the region revolted against the Byzantine Emperor Isaac II. After the success of the uprising, it became the core of the Second Bulgarian Empire. Due to the early proeminence of the Tsardom’s Vlach element, western sources, who first came into contact with it during the Third and Fourth Crusades, and even Byzantine sources, like Niketas Choniates, sometimes refer to the new Bulgarian state as Vlach. Thus, the French knights Guillaume de Rubrouquis and Geoffroy de Villehardouin refer to Asen's Wallachia, and the friar William of Rubruck divides Bulgaria during the realm of Michael II Asen into "Blakia—Assan's territory—and Little Bulgaria".

In opposition to White Wallachia, Byzantine sources also refer to a "Black Wallachia", which was Moldavia (or part of it). The Principality of Moldavia itself came to be named White Wallachia (Turkish: Ak-Eflak) by the Ottomans, with the moniker of Black Wallachia (Turkish: Kara-Eflak) coming to refer to the neighbouring Principality of Wallachia.
