= Fall of Arsuf =

Battle in the later Crusades

Fall of Arsuf (1265)
- Part of The Crusades
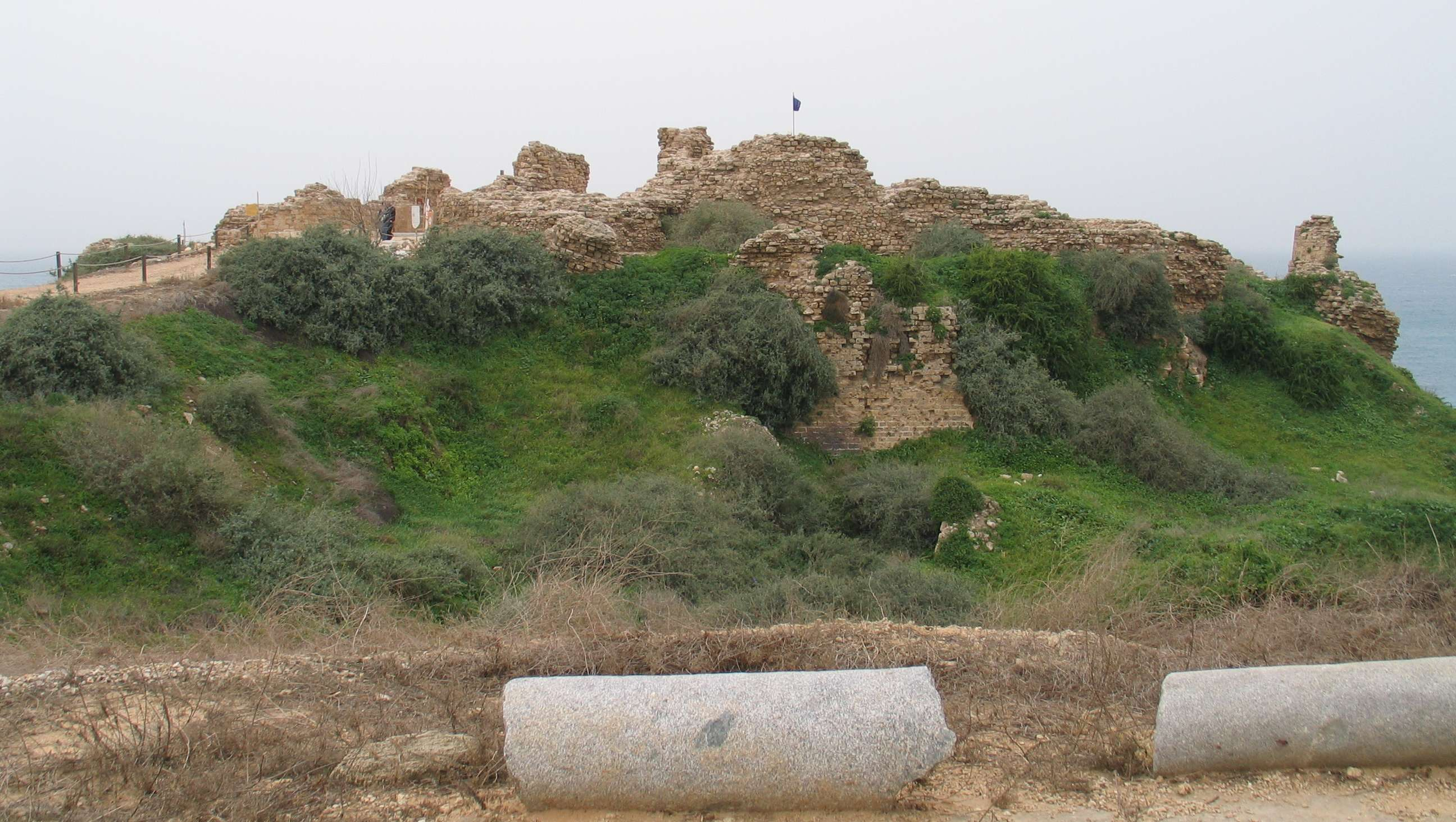
- Ruins of Arsuf fortress
Date	21/22 March – 29 April 1265
Location	Arsuf
Result	Mamluk victory

Belligerents
Mamluk Sultanate	(Sovereign Military Order of Malta) Knights Hospitaller

Commanders and leaders
Baibars	Unknown

Strength
Unknown	270 Knights

Casualties and losses
Unknown	90 killed 180 captured

In the year 1265, the Mamluk sultan, Baibars, besieged the Knights hospitaller's stronghold of Arsuf. Baibars successfully captured Arsuf.

== Background ==
In 1261, Balian of Arsuf leased the Arsuf fort to Knights Hospitallers for 4,000 bezants a year in the hopes that the Knights would fortify the city against the threat posed by Baibars. After being given command of the city, the knights started building a fort there in 1263, most likely in an effort to increase the size of the eastern portion of the walls. According to Baibars, this was a betrayal of their agreement to a peace treaty.

== Siege ==
On March 21/22, 1265, a large and well-equipped Mamluk army led by the sultan himself besieged the fort of Arsuf. The fort was well prepared for the siege; the walls were strongly fortified, and the provisions were enough for a long siege. Baibars laid siege to the city for 35 days, and on April 26, the Mamluk launched a fierce assault that successfully pushed the Hospitallers to the citadel. The rest of the knights fought off the Mamluks for the next three days until they surrendered on condition they would depart freely. Baibars agreed but later reneged on his promise and took the rest to slavery. He even had the captives demolish the fort of Arsuf and leave it in ruins.

== Sources ==
- Slack, Corliss K. (2013). Historical Dictionary of the Crusades. Scarecrow Press.
- Gestes des Chiprois, Part III, ed. Gaston Raynaud, Genève, 1887
- Ruth E. Jackson-Tal & Oren Tal, Crusader Glass in Context: The Destruction of Arsur (Apollonia-Arsuf, Israel), April 1265.
- Jonathan Riley-Smith, The Knights Hospitaller in the Levant, C.1070-1309.
