= Izz al-Din ibn Shaddad =

Arab scholar and Ayyubid official (1217–1285)

Izz al-Din ibn Shaddad al-Halabi (1217–1285) (Arabic: عز الدين بن شدّاد) was an Arab scholar and official for the Ayyubids from Aleppo.

'Izz al-Din Muhammad b. 'Ali ibn Shaddad al-Halabi, often quoted simply as Ibn Shaddad, is best known for his Al-a'laq al-khatira fi dhikr umara' al-Sham wa'l-Jazira, a historical geography of Syria (al-Sham) and Upper Mesopotamia (al-Jazira), which he wrote in exile in Egypt after the Mongols overran Syria. This work has been translated into French and published by Anne-Marie Eddé as Description de la Syrie du Nord in Damascus in 1984.

He also wrote Ta'rikh al-Malik al-zahir, a biography of Baybars I, the Mamluk ruler of Egypt.
