= Audi filia et vide and De sinu patris =

13th-century adultery admonishment

Audi filia et vide and De sinu patris are 13th-century papal letters addressed, respectively, to a widowed queen of Cyprus and a married nobleman of the Kingdom of Jerusalem. In the letters, a pope rebukes unnamed recipients for maintaining an extramarital relationship. Because neither letter is dated, their authorship and the identities of the individuals involved have been the subject of prolonged scholarly discussion. The letters have variously been attributed to Urban IV, with proposed dates of 1261 or 1262, or to Clement IV, dated to 1267 or 1268.

The nobleman, referred to only as "Count J.", is described as the husband of a sister of the king of Cilicia, a description that fits John of Ibelin, count of Jaffa. A contemporary marginal note characterizing the relationship as incestuous has been cited in support of identifying the queen as John's kinswoman Isabella of Ibelin. Since John died in 1266, a year before Isabella became a widow, it has also been proposed that the nobleman was instead Julian Grenier, lord of Sidon and son-in-law of the Cilician king.

One version of the letter to the nobleman names the bishop of Bethlehem as papal legate. As the bishop of Bethlehem held this office during the pontificate of Urban IV, this detail has been taken by modern historians as supporting attribution of the letter to Urban and identification of its recipients as John of Ibelin and Plaisance of Antioch, who died in 1261. Plaisance, queen of Cyprus, ruled the Kingdom of Jerusalem as regent, while Count John held a dominant position among the kingdom's nobility; the affair is interpreted as a mutually beneficial relationship meant to further the couple's political goals.

== Transmissions ==
Audi filia et vide and De sinu patris appear in the collections of three 13th-century papal notaries: Berard of Naples, Richard of Pofi, and Marinus of Eboli. The version from the collection of Berard of Naples, who entered the papal chancery during the pontificate of Urban IV (r. 1261–1264), is longer than that in Richard of Pofi's collection and probably a rough draft. Richard's briefer version is rhetorically more refined and probably reworked. The copies in Marinus of Eboli's collection had not been published or investigated by 1978; they turned out to contain the same text as those in Berard's collection. Berard's version is transmitted in several manuscripts:

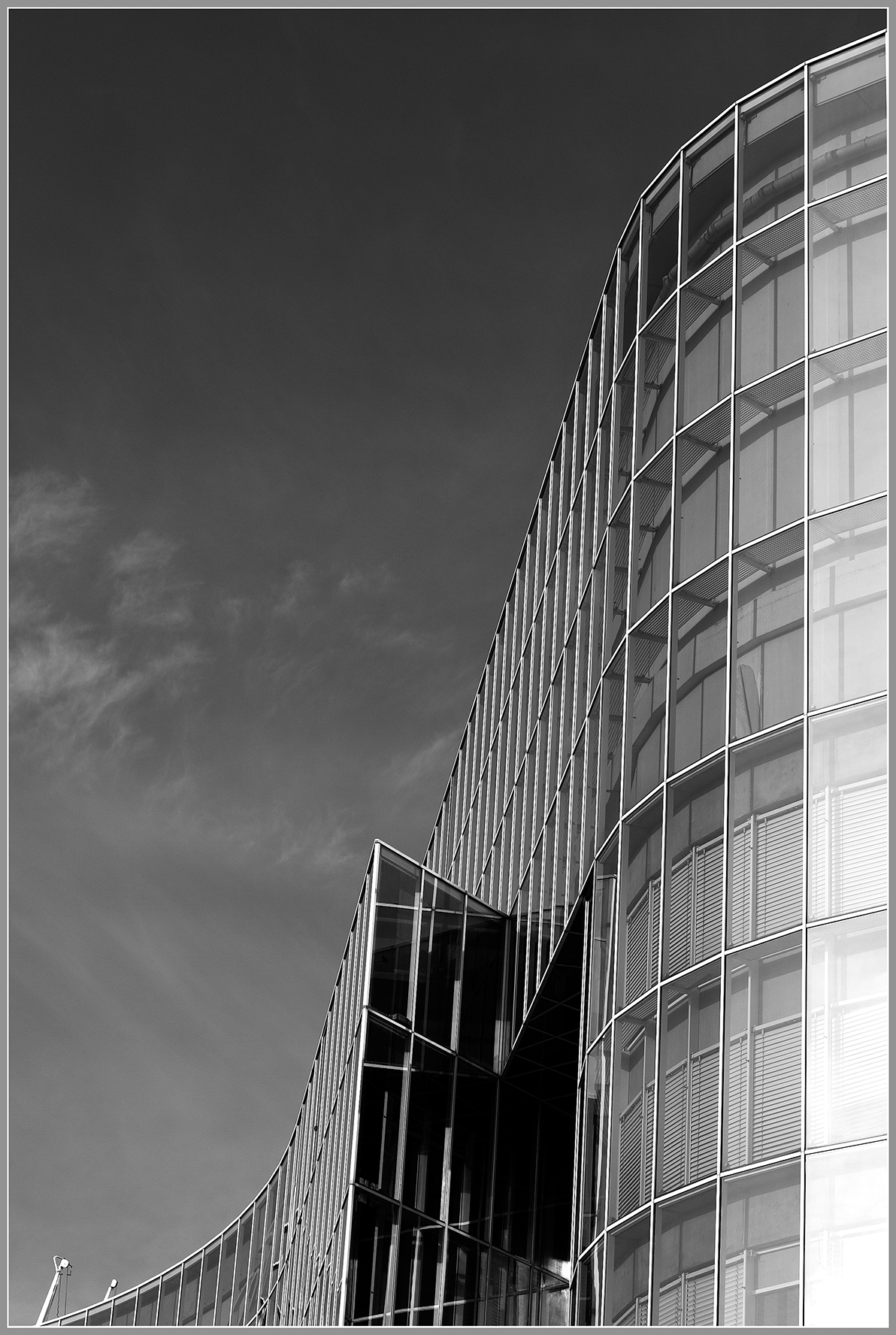
Some of the copies of Audi filia et vide and De sinu patris are kept at the Bordeaux municipal library.

- Registrum Vaticanum 29A, numbers 1 and 2
- MS Bordeaux, Bibliothèque municipale 761, numbers 1 and 2
- MS Paris Lat. 4311 (Epistolae notabiles), numbers 7 and 8
- MS Vat. lat. 6735, numbers 7 and 8
- Rome, Biblioteca Vallicelliana MSC 49, numbers 279 and 3

Reg. Vat. 29A is not a part of the official papal register series, notwithstanding its classification, but rather a copy from Berard's private compilation which only entered the Vatican Archives in 1754, although it may have been kept there at an earlier point. This circumstance gave rise to uncertainty among editors over the pontificate under which the letters were issued.

Due to their incorporation in three letter collections, Audi filia et vide and De sinu patris are preserved in a substantial number of copies. Édouard Jordan included the letters in his edition of the registers of Clement IV (r. 1265–1268), where they were assigned the conjectural date "Viterbo 1268". Jean Guiraud later published the same texts in the appendix to the fourth volume of the registers of Urban IV as nos. 2807 and 2808, without proposing a date. In their most recent publication, Aloysius L. Tăutu again placed the letters under Clement IV and dated them broadly to 1267–1268. He did so without knowledge of Guiraud's earlier attribution to Urban IV and without awareness of the previous scholarly discussion of the two documents.

== Contents ==
In Audi filia et vide, a pope chastisises an unnamed queen for a lack of chastity that scandalizes her people. The pope instructs her to suppress her sexual desires or, if she cannot, to marry, or else she would burn in hell. If she fails to comply, the pope writes that appropriate measures would be taken. The incipit Audi filia et vide (lit. 'Listen, daughter, and see') comes from Psalm 44.

De sinu patris is addressed to "the nobleman Count J." (Latin: "Nobili viro J. comiti"). In a version of the letter transmitted by Berard of Naples and Marinus of Eboli, found in Bullarium Cyprium, Count J. is identified as the husband of a sister of the king of Cilician Armenia. The count is reprimanded by the pope for committing adultery with an unidentified noblewoman. In Reg. Vat. 29A, a large blank space appears instead of the mistress's name and/or title, and the missing text does not appear in the other manuscripts. In Richard of Pofi's version of the letter, the offending woman is identified as a queen. In the letter, the pope orders J. to end his adulterous affair and take his wife and children back. In Berard's version, the count is warned that, if he should fail to obey, the pope would task the papal legate with executing his order. The language in Berard's De sinu patris is much stronger than that in Audi filia et vide and the pope's threat to the count clearer than that to the queen.

Berard's extended version employs the ornate language customarily reserved for arengas (exhortatory openings of papal documents). Richard of Pofi's versions make clear that the letters refer to the same illicit relationship, as the letter to the queen contains an admonition that is absent from Berard's version:

O daughter, don't forget that the noble count has been joined with the sister of the king by the chain of matrimony and had a child by her.

De sinu patris is softened in Richard's version, as the pope does not threaten the count with sending a legate; instead it contains the same general threat of papal enforcement found in the letter to the queen. Similarly, the queen is not threatened with hellfire in Richard's version.

== Debate over identities ==
The identification of the three people involved in the letters–the adulterous count, the unchaste queen, and the pope who addresses them–has been a matter of much debate among historians. A marginal note–an addition that is not part of the letter itself–found only in Bordeaux MS 761 clarifies that the letter is addressed to the queen of Cyprus. Because Charlotte of Lusignan, the first queen regnant of the Kingdom of Cyprus, was married throughout her reign, the note suggests that the recipient must have been a widow–a queen dowager. The title and name initial of the unfaithful ("Count J.") and his identification in the letter as the husband of the Armenian king's sister fits John of Ibelin, count of Jaffa; his wife, Maria, was the sister of King Hethum I.

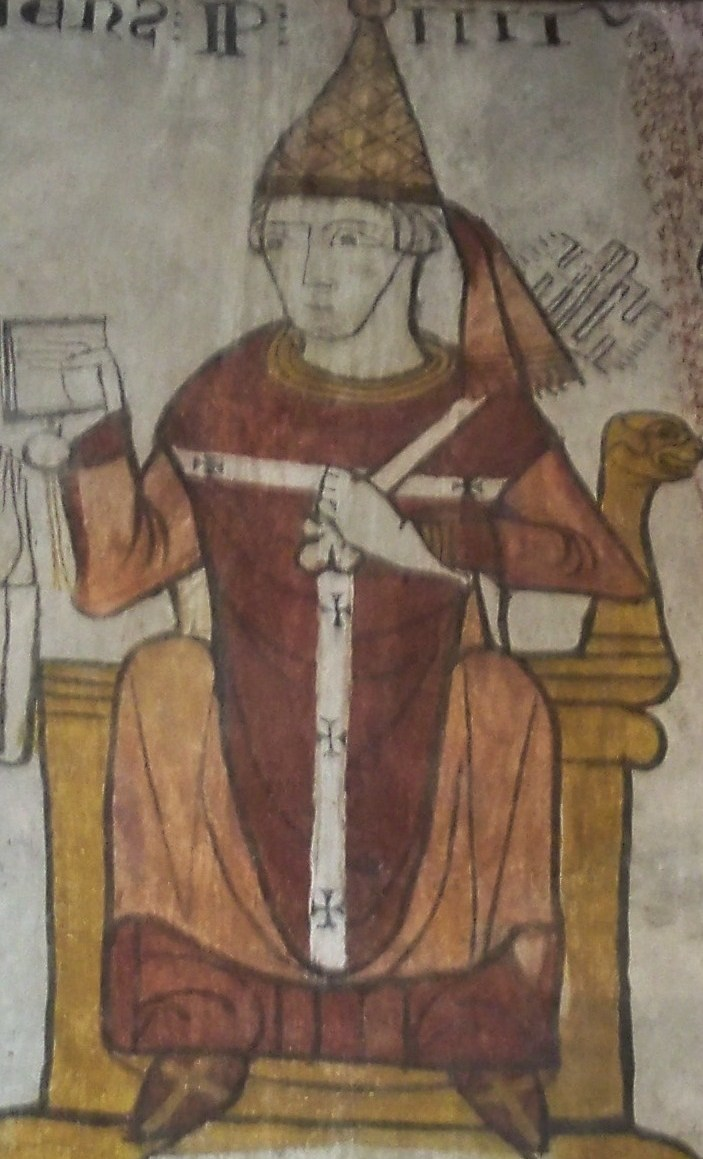
Some historians have attributed the letters to Clement IV.

The historian and librarian Léopold Delisle, who was the first to print Audi filia et vide along with the note, felt that the group of letters that included Audi filia et vide belonged to Clement IV; he identified the recipient as Isabella of Ibelin, lady of Beirut and widow of the teenage King Hugh II. Delisle thus dated the letter to the period between December 1267 (the date of Hugh's death) and November 1268 (the date of Clement's death) and argued that it was composed in Viterbo, where Clement spent 1268. The historian Ferdinand Kaltenbrunner dated the letters to the pontificate of Urban IV, Clement's predecessor, instead; he pointed out that the letters in Berard's collection were ordered according to pontificates and argued that the placement of Audi filia et vide and De sinu patris within the collection suggests that they were composed shortly after Berard started his career in the papal chancery–that is, during Urban's ponitificate.

Reg. Vat. 29A contains another marginal note, in which the relationship is described as incestuous. This led Jordan to also identify the queen as Isabella of Ibelin: under canon law, she was related to John of Ibelin in the fourth degree (she being a great-great-granddaughter and John a grandson of Balian of Ibelin), which was too close for them to marry. The problem with the identification of the couple as Isabella and John of Ibelin is that John died on 7 December 1266–a year before Isabella was widowed. The historian Hans E. Mayer concedes that this note is contemporary, but emphasizes that it was not written by the author of the letter, in which there are no accusations of incest.

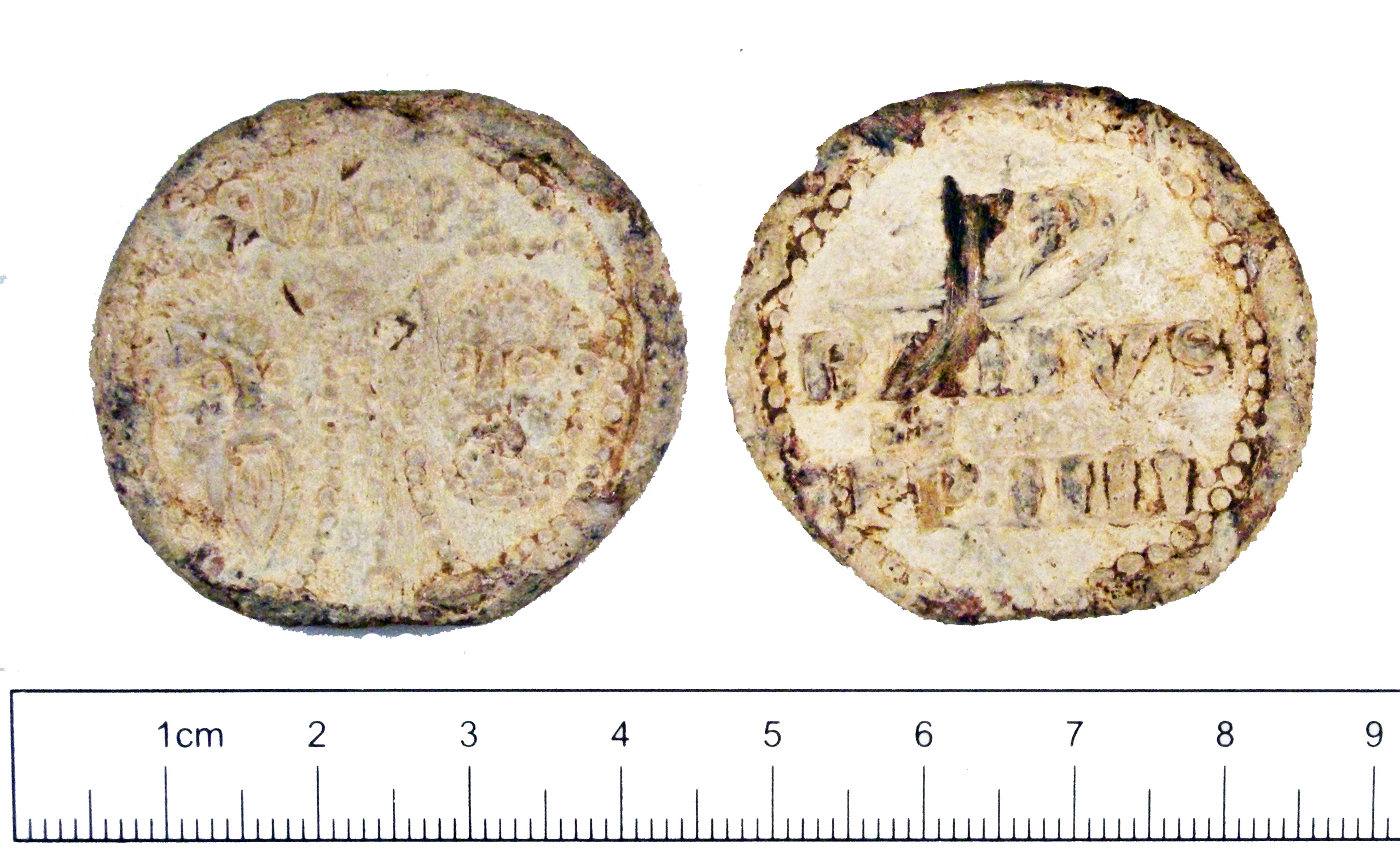
Bulla (seal) of Urban IV. New evidence suggests that the letters were composed during his pontificate.

The historian H. Otto ascribes to Kaltenbrunner's dating of the letters to Urban IV's pontificate and proposed that the queen may have been Plaisance of Antioch, widow of King Henry I and mother of Hugh II. Plaisance and John were not related in any way, and this may be why Otto was not confident in his identification of her as one of the recipients. Because Urban became pope in August 1261 and Plaisance died most likely in September, Otto concluded that Berard must have composed the letter on the pope's behalf between September and October 1261. Mayer adds that the news of Plaisance's death might have only reached Rome in early 1262, thus extending the range during which the letters may have been written.

The historian Friedrich Bock suggests that the nobleman to whom De sinu patris is addressed was Julian Grenier, lord of Sidon. Like John, Julian married into the Armenian royal family; his wife was Euphemia, daughter of King Hethum I. By March 1264, Euphemia had left Julian, a notorious gambler, and returned to her father, prompting Urban to intervene in an attempt to save the marriage. Mayer dismisses this view as having "no merits" because the letter describes Count J. (not lord) as the husband of the Armenian king's sister (not daughter).

Historians of the Crusades have taken different sides in the debate over the identities of the people involved in the letters. George Hill took the view that the queen must be Isabella, not Plaisance, and her lover John, who "cannot, as generally supposed, have died as early as 1266". Noting that Isabella subsequently married three times, Hill writes that she "followed the pope's advice very thoroughly". Steven Runciman says the letters were provoked by Isabella's "notorious lack of chastity and, in particular, her liaison with Julian of Sidon". He argues that, aside from having died in 1266, John is less likely to have been the recipient because of his good reputation–as opposed to "notoriously loose-living" Julian–and that the letters may have confused the generation of the Cilician royal family to which Julian's wife belonged. Jonathan Riley-Smith was convinced by his pupil Peter Edbury's "revived" view that the affair was between Plaisance and John. Christopher Tyerman writes about two affairs: one between Plaisance and John, the other between Isabella and Julian.

Berard's version of the letter found in Bullarium Cyprium contains evidence that is missing from the Bordeaux manuscript, apparently due to an omission per homeoteleuton (a type of scribal error). Here the pope says that he will discuss the matter with the bishop "of Bethlehem, legate of the Apostolic See". The only bishop of Bethlehem who was papal legate was Thomas Agni of Lentini, appointed in 1259; he did not hold either position in 1268. This has led historian Chris Schabel to state that the protracted debate "has hopefully ended in favour of Urban, John, and Plaisance, and the letter is now dated to the end of 1261".

Relationship between Plaisance, John, Isabella, and Julian

John I of Beirut	Philip of Ibelin	Helvis of Ibelin
Balian of Beirut	John of Arsuf	John of Jaffa	Marie of Cilicia	Hethum I of Cilicia	Balian of Sidon
John II of Beirut	Henry I of Cyprus	Plaisance of Antioch	Balian of Arsuf	Euphemia of Cilicia	Julian of Sidon
Isabella of Beirut	Hugh II of Cyprus

== Historical context and interpretations ==
Queen Plaisance of Cyprus ruled Cyprus as the regent for her son, King Hugh II, who was also heir presumptive to the Kingdom of Jerusalem. She married Balian of Arsuf, a member of the powerful Ibelin family, to bolster her rule in Cyprus, but the marriage quickly faltered and was annulled. From February 1258 until her death in her twenties in September 1261, Plaisance also ruled the Kingdom of Jerusalem–then consisting of a narrow coastal strip that included Jaffa and Sidon–as regent in the name of her son. John of Jaffa, a member of another branch of the Ibelin family, was one of the masterminds behind the recognition of Plaisance as regent of the Kingdom of Jerusalem.

Because she lived on Cyprus, Plaisance appointed first John of Arsuf and then, after his death, Geoffrey of Sargines to govern the mainland kingdom on her behalf. Mayer posits that John of Jaffa and Plaisance began an intimate relationship for political reasons, saying that "queens and very high magnates ... could not afford to disregard the political implications of their marriages as well as their affairs." In his interpretation, John aimed to counter the influence of John of Arsuf and Geoffrey of Sargines, while Plaisance sought to ally herself with the man who was then the most powerful nobleman in the mainland kingdom. If this is the case, the affair must have started in mid-1258 at the earliest. Mayer believes that, in starting an affair with John of Jaffa, Plaisance repeated what she had tried with the Arsuf branch, and that John also took the lead from the rival branch of his family; their relationship could be no more than an illicit affair because John was already married. The affair does not appear to have appreciably furthered John's political interests. Edbury suggests that it may have preceded John's intervention in support of Plaisance's claim to the regency.

The nobility of the Kingdom of Jerusalem disapproved of the alliance between King Hethum I of Cilicia and the expanding Mongol Empire. Mayer speculates that Julian of Sidon and John of Jaffa may have connived to separate from their wives when their Cilician marriages turned politically inconvenient. Edbury notes that King Hugh's marriage with Isabella of Beirut is recorded as having been concluded in only one near-contemporary source, the Lignages d'Outremer; other sources speak only of preparations being made for the marriage.

The letters may have had a personal motivation. Before becoming pope, James Pantaleon (Urban IV) was the Latin patriarch of Jerusalem and thus well-acquainted with the situation in the kingdom. He had developed a dislike for John of Jaffa and sided with John of Arsur. Mayer speculates that James may have witnessed the beginning of John's affair with Plaisance and interprets the strong language of the pope's letter to John as a concern about the potential implications of the relationship. James travelled to Italy in early 1261 and was elected pope on 29 August; only weeks later, Plaisance died. The letters may have still been in draft form when the pope learned of the queen's death and it is possible that they were never sent. John consequently faced no ecclesiastical sanctions. It is not known whether he reconciled with his wife.
