= Philippe Henriot =

French politician and collaborationist (1889–1944)

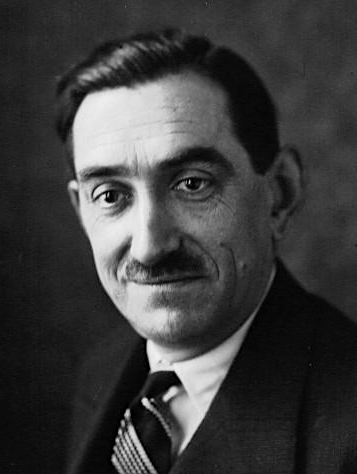

Secretary of State for Information and Propaganda
- In office 6 January 1944 – 28 June 1944

Member of the Chamber of Deputies
- In office 27 September 1932 – 31 May 1942 Serving with Georges Mandel
- Preceded by: Daniel Bergey
- Succeeded by: Position abolished
- Constituency: Gironde

Personal details
- Born: 7 January 1889 Reims, France
- Died: 28 June 1944 (aged 55) Paris, France
- Cause of death: Assassination
- Resting place: Saint-André-et-Appelles
- Party: Fédération Nationale Catholique; Popular Republican Union of Gironde; Jeunesses Patriotes; Republican Federation
- Parent: Georges Henriot (father)
- Education: Institut Catholique de Paris
- Profession: Literature teacher Winemaker

Philippe Henriot (English: /ɒ̃ˈriːoʊ/ ahn-REE-oh, French: [filip ɑ̃ʁjo]; 7 January 1889 – 28 June 1944) was a French poet, journalist, politician, and Nazi collaborator who served as Secretary of State for Information and Propaganda for Vichy France. He was also a member of the Chamber of Deputies from 1932 to 1942, representing Gironde. Henriot was known for his influential speeches in support of collaborationism, which eventually led to his 1944 assassination by the French Resistance.

== Career ==
Philippe Henriot, a devout Roman Catholic, and poet who had written several books of poetry during the early 1920s, became politically active during the Republican Federation, and was elected to the Third Republic's Chamber of Deputies for the Gironde department in 1932 and 1936. He became "a committed member of the Catholic nationalist right". By the mid-1930s his anti-republican prejudices made him a natural opponent of the Popular Front and his speeches showed him to be anti-communist, antisemitic, anti-Freemasonry, and against the parliamentary system. In 1936 General de Castelnau, the aristocratic leader of the National Catholic Federation, described Henriot as "an ardent defender of religion, the family and society." At the beginning of World War II, he was strongly anti-German. However, in 1941 Henriot began to support Nazi Germany after it invaded the Soviet Union in Operation Barbarossa, as he hoped for the defeat of communism, believing that Bolshevism was the enemy of Christianity.

== Propagandist ==
In 1940, after the Armistice of 22 June 1940 and France's surrender to Nazi Germany, Henriot became active as a journalist working for the French government headed by Philippe Pétain which had moved to Vichy. In December 1943 he was appointed Secretary of State for Information. During his career he created programmes and broadcast through Radio Paris, becoming the government's spokesman. He developed a war of propaganda against the Free French Forces and the BBC, whose spokesmen were Pierre Dac and Maurice Schumann.

Seeking to shape the perceptions of the French government and German occupation, and to destroy popular support for the French Resistance, Henriot was given the nickname of the "French Goebbels". He broadcast twice daily on Radio-Vichy, "repeatedly and eloquently attacking all those he considered lukewarm in their attitude to collaboration and calling on all good Catholics to support the German cause in the fight against communism." He continued the propaganda programmes after the Germans decided, due to the new Allied presence in North Africa, to extend their military occupation in 1942 over Southern France, formerly the Free Zone controlled by the French government at Vichy.

Henriot warned the French people about any association with the Allies or "terrorists" (resistance groups) and countered the arguments of the Free French Forces broadcasting from the BBC. He wrote and delivered 270 broadcasts on Radio Vichy in a "mesmerising rhetoric and delivery" ... as a "huge media star", according to one source. "There is no doubt Henriot's broadcasts were influential, attracting a large and diverse audience."

It was said that "Henriot is listened to by everyone, enemies or supporters. Families shift their meal times so as not to miss him. There is no-one left in the street at the time he speaks." On 6 January 1944, Henriot was appointed as the French Minister of Information and Propaganda.

In 1943 he joined the Milice paramilitaries, "with a deep-seated conviction that Christian civilisation was engaged in a life and death struggle against Bolshevism."

== Assassination ==
Henriot was a natural target for the French Resistance, and on 28 June 1944, in the Ministry building where he lived, he was assassinated by a group of COMAC members of the Maquis, an organisation designated by the Vichy government as "terrorists". Disguised as members of the Milice, they had persuaded him to open his door. In retaliation, the Milice murdered Georges Mandel, a strong opponent of collaboration and others. Henriot was afforded a state funeral in Paris, presided over by Cardinal Suhard in Notre Dame Cathedral. His coffin was placed, surrounded by French flags and flowers, in front of the Hôtel de Ville, where thousands filed past to mourn him – less than two months before the Liberation of Paris.
