= History of Jerusalem during the Kingdom of Jerusalem =

Jerusalem under Crusader rule, 12th-13th centuries

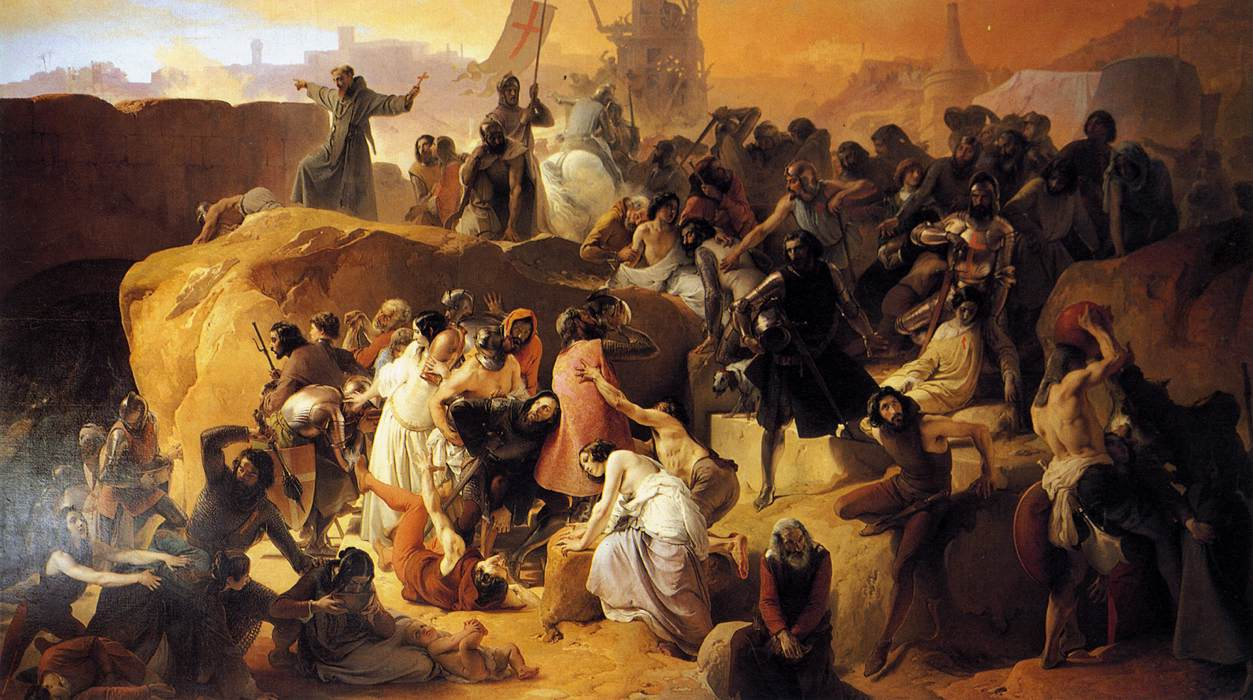
Crusaders thirsting under the walls of Jerusalem (Francesco Hayez, 1836–50)

The History of Jerusalem during the Kingdom of Jerusalem began with the capture of the city by the Latin Christian forces at the apogee of the First Crusade. At that point it had been under Muslim rule for over 450 years. It became the capital of the Latin Kingdom of Jerusalem, until it was again conquered by the Ayyubids under Saladin in 1187. For the next forty years, a series of Christian campaigns, including the Third and Fifth Crusades, attempted in vain to retake the city, until Emperor Frederick II led the Sixth Crusade and successfully negotiated its return in 1229.

In 1244, the city was taken by Khwarazmian troops. After 1260 the Ayyubid realm that included Jerusalem was taken over by the Mamluks of Egypt and the city was gradually rebuilt during the later 13th century, while the shrinking coastal Crusader state was gradually defeated until its final demise in 1291.

== Overview ==
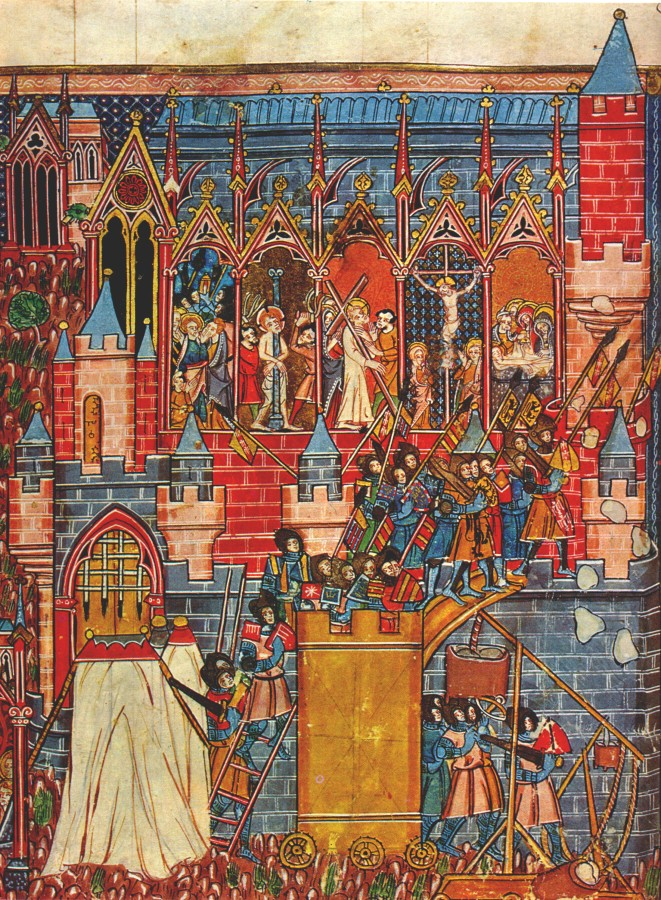
Conquest of Jerusalem by the Crusaders (13th- or 14th-century miniature)

The Crusaders conquered the city in 1099 and held it until its conquest by the army of Saladin at the siege of Jerusalem in 1187 and its surrender to the Ayyubid dynasty, a Muslim sultanate that ruled in the Middle East in the early 12th century. The Sixth Crusade put Jerusalem back under Crusader rule from 1229 to 1244, until the city was captured by the Khwarazmians. The Crusader–Ayyubid conflict ended with the rise of the Mamluks from Egypt in 1260 and their conquest of the Holy Land.

The Ayyubid period ended with waves of destruction of the city. Its fortifications were destroyed first, and later most of the buildings, as part of a deliberate scorched earth policy intended to prevent all future crusades from gaining a foothold in the city and region.

This was a short but relatively turbulent and significant period in the history of Jerusalem. For the first time since the destruction of the city in 70 CE, Jerusalem was the capital of a separate political entity, a status only regained during the British Mandate in the 20th century.

The Crusader period in the history of Jerusalem decisively influenced the history of the whole Middle East, radiating beyond the region into the Islamic World and Christian Europe. The Crusades elevated the position of Jerusalem in the hierarchy of places holy to Islam, but it did not become a spiritual or political center of Islam. By the end of the Ayyubid period the name of Jerusalem was no longer connected to the idea of jihad, and the city's geopolitical status declined, becoming a secondary city, first for the Mamluk Empire, and later for the Ottomans.

== Christian control (1099–1187) ==
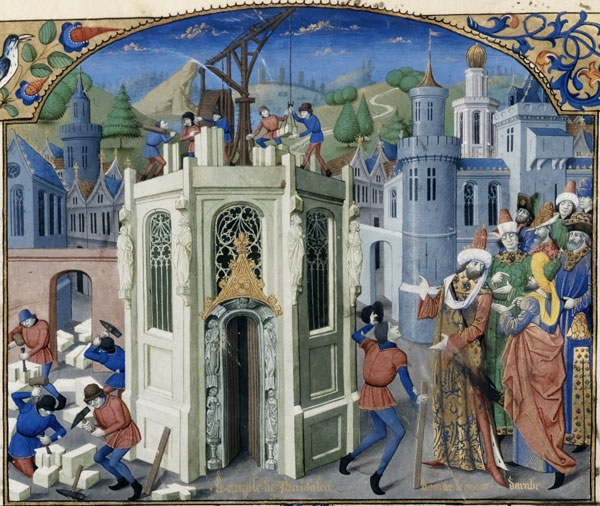
Crusaders rebuilding the Temple (15th-century manuscript)

=== Crusader conquest of Jerusalem ===
The conquest of Jerusalem became the prime objective of the First Crusade, which was launched in 1095 with Pope Urban II's call to arms. Four main Crusader armies left Europe in August 1096. On June 7, 1099, the crusaders arrived at Jerusalem. The city was besieged by the army beginning on July 13. Attacks on the city walls started on July 14, with a huge battering ram and two siege towers. On July 15 by noon the Crusaders were on the northern wall and the Muslim defenses collapsed.

=== Capital of the Kingdom of Jerusalem ===
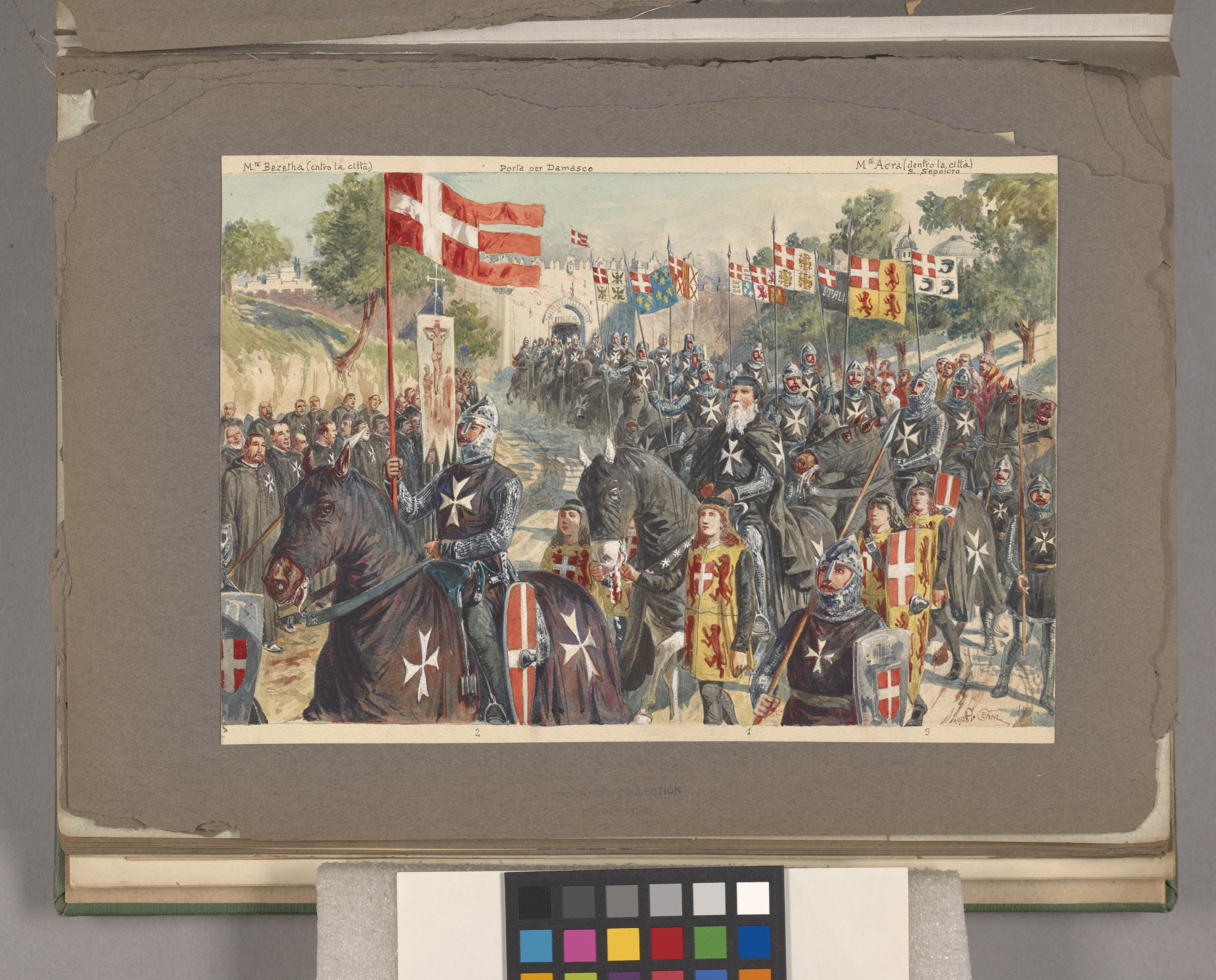
Knights Hospitaller riding out of St Stephen's Gate (see Damascus Gate), 1908 illustration by Quinto Cenni.

Animation of 12th-century Jerusalem (correct depiction: Church of the Holy Sepulchre; faulty: citadel [fantasy], Dome of the Rock [Ottoman tile decoration, modern gilded dome]); in Latin with English subtitles (via 'cc' button)

With the conquest of Jerusalem, most Crusaders returned home to Europe, and only a small number of pilgrims settled in the Holy Land. They faced vast challenges, including having their capital of the Kingdom of Jerusalem outside the main trade routes and away from coastal ports.

The Crusaders' massacre in Jerusalem created a dramatic change in the composition of the population. Muslims and Jews were murdered or deported and banned from the city. William of Tyre wrote:

gentiles who had almost lost all its inhabitants with the sword after the city was broken into by force, if some escaped by accident, do not give them more room in the city to live. Heaven-fearing leaders seemed sacrilege which would allow those who were not among the followers of Christianity have such an esteemed residents instead.

After the conquest, Jerusalem was emptied of inhabitants, and many houses were abandoned. Much of the surviving Jewish community, those not killed during the conquest, resettled in Ascalon. The Latin city's population was very small and centred upon the Church of the Holy Sepulchre and Tower of David. William of Tyre wrote:

within the walls of cities, in houses, just hard to find a safe place, that the inhabitants were few and scattered and ruined walls were open enemy attack. Thieves were attacking at night, breaking into the abandoned cities, whose inhabitants lived far from one another. As a result, some secretly, others openly would have left the property that have acquired and began returning to their countries.

The Crusaders' first step was to stop the fleeing population by announcing a law that a person holding an asset for a year becomes its owner. Real improvement was achieved by populating Jerusalem with residents belonging to sects of Eastern Christianity. First, Christians who had been deported before the siege were returned to the city and named by the Crusaders as "Syrian". At the same time, the local authorities encouraged other Christians to settle in Jerusalem Christians, although suspicious relations between these various groups and the struggle for supremacy and control of the Holy Sepulchre caused many problems.

During his reign, Baldwin I (1100–1118) reimposed the Roman-era ban on Jewish residence in Jerusalem. As a result, both Benjamin of Tudela and Petachiah of Regensburg reported that almost no Jews remained in the city toward the end of the 12th century.

In 1115 Syrian Christians, uprooted from their homes in Transjordan, settled in the city, creating a continuously populated district on the north side of town, which was named after them. Simultaneously, the Crusader rulers encouraged commerce, and in 1120 King Baldwin II of Jerusalem imposed duties on goods and food products brought into Jerusalem. This was then extended to all types of trade and all agricultural food products brought from the hinterland into the city.

Unusually for a city in the Middle Ages, the economy of Jerusalem relied heavily on the tourism of pilgrims from Christian Europe. It received a further boost when it was exempted from customs enabling the city's markets to develop and sell the pilgrims imported goods. The importance of this industry continued to grow with the establishment of Jerusalem as a holy place, which also led to improved roads and traffic safety. Another factor affecting the economy of the city was the various administrative centres - regal, ecclesiastical, and military - that operated from Jerusalem.

Being a capital city, Jerusalem was the centre of a number of military orders. The oldest was the Knights Hospitaller, which was originally established to provide medical assistance to Christian pilgrims who travelled to Jerusalem. In time, the order assumed military functions to fight against Muslims. Its first location was in a place that is now known as Muristan, close to the Church of the Holy Sepulchre. The order built hospital and a shelter for pilgrims there. Benjamin of Tudela reports that the Order had a compound with 400 resident knights, and where patients were taken care of.

The second order was the Knights Templar, founded in 1118. Its official function, as stated in the founders' declaration, was to protect the Crusader kingdom in the Holy Land and the pilgrims' access to the holy places in the Kingdom of Jerusalem. Alongside the protection of pilgrims, the Templars provided a significant military force that included thousands of soldiers, with several hundred knights, in defense of the Kingdom of Jerusalem. The Templars established their headquarters at Al-Aqsa Mosque and over time added complex structures and strengthened the fortifications. Benjamin of Tudela said that "300 knights" out of Solomon's Temple were ready to fight the enemies of the Christian faith.

Another order, the Order of Saint Lazarus, was founded to care for leprosy patients. A special place was set for them outside of the walls of Jerusalem, named after Saint Lazarus. This Leper House gave its name to leper colonies established all over Europe. The Order of Saint Lazarus included both lepers and healthy people who held religious and military positions. This phenomenon, a military religious order of lepers who took an active part in the country alongside a healthy population, had no parallel in Europe at that time.

== Ayyubid control (1187–1229) ==
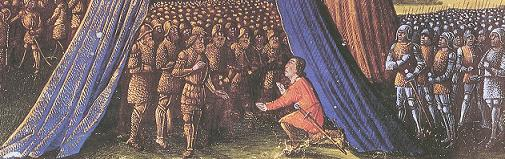
Surrender of the city of Jerusalem, Balian of Ibelin before Saladin (from manuscript, c. 1490)

=== Saladin's conquest of Jerusalem ===
After the victory of the Muslims in the Battle of Hattin on July 4, 1187, almost all the cities and citadels of the Kingdom of Jerusalem were conquered by the Muslim army led by Saladin. On September 17, Muslim troops came against the walls of Jerusalem, and on September 20, Saladin himself at the head of his army besieged Jerusalem, which contained about 30,000 residents and another 30,000 refugees from around the Christian Holy Land. The siege was relatively short but intense and violent, as both sides saw the city as their religious and cultural center. After bitter fighting, the Muslims were able to undermine the city's fortifications in the area between Damascus Gate and Herod's Gate, near where the Crusaders broke into the town in 1099. The defenders realized that they were doomed, and that it was not possible to maintain the Christian conquest of Jerusalem. At the request of the Latin Patriarch Hiraklios, and probably under pressure from the civilian population, the Christians decided to enter into negotiations with Saladin, leading to a conditional surrender. The Crusaders threatened to harm the Islamic holy sites on the Temple Mount, the Dome of the Rock and Al-Aqsa Mosque if the blockade continued. This threat, combined with pressure from the Muslim battalion commanders to end the fighting, led to the signing of a contract which surrendered the city to Saladin, making the residents prisoners of war who could redeem themselves for a fee.

On October 2 Jerusalem was given to Saladin. The rich of the city, including the Dean and Latin Christians, managed to save themselves, but the poor and refugees who had come to the city with nothing were unable to pay the ransom. Most of the church treasures were taken from the city by the Latin Patriarch, who passed them to the Muslim cavalry in order to release certain prisoners. Saladin released thousands of others without compensation, including Queen Sybil, wife of Guy de Lusignan, king of Jerusalem, who was allowed to visit her husband in prison in Nablus. About 15,000 Christians were left destitute in the city. After 40 days, they were taken as prisoners in convoys to Muslim cities such as Damascus and Cairo, where they spent their lives as slaves. Christians who managed to escape from Palestine and Jerusalem went through ports controlled by the Egyptians, such as Ashkelon, and even Alexandria, where they were loaded on to ships of the Italian communes on their way to Europe. The fall of Jerusalem and the holy places shocked Europe. The shock led to the sudden death of Pope Urban III, and the departure of the Third Crusade. For Saladin, the conquest of Jerusalem was a significant political achievement, placing him as the defender of religion and a legendary military commander in chief, and giving him special status in the Muslim world.

=== Jerusalem under the Muslims ===
After the conquest of Jerusalem, Saladin acted to erase the city's Christian character. Crusader additions to buildings were destroyed. In the Dome of the Rock, statues and altars were removed and the building returned to being a mosque. The great Church of Saint Mary building became a hospital. The Church of St. Anne became a madrasa, and other churches were destroyed and their stones used to repair damage from the siege. In addition, much attention was devoted to the restoration and enhancement of the fortifications of the city to prepare for a possible future attack by the Christians.

The Crusaders had been driven from the city, but local Christians belonging to the Eastern Orthodox Church and Oriental Orthodox Churches, remained in the city as dhimmis by paying a poll tax (Arabic: jizya جزية), and in return were allowed to stay in the city.

The Church of the Holy Sepulchre was handed over to the Greek Orthodox community, and the keys of the church were entrusted to two Muslim families. To strengthen the position and image of the Muslims of Jerusalem, Saladin created a system of waqf, which sustained religious institutions in Jerusalem, such as schools and mosques, by linking revenues and rent to assets, providing endowments which funded the ongoing maintenance of the buildings and supported believers.

The Christian world's response came quickly, and the Third Crusade came from Europe in 1190, seeking to reverse the effects of the defeat at the Battle of Hattin, and retake the Kingdom of Jerusalem, and the city of Jerusalem. Fighting began with the siege of Acre (1189–91), and from there the Crusaders, led by Richard the Lionheart, moved on to Jerusalem. After the military success in the Battle of Arsuf, the Crusaders arrived at Jerusalem, but for various tactical and political reasons, withdrew and decided not to try to conquer it. Instead, both sides entered negotiations, during which Saladin declared that the idea of jihad and the sanctity of Jerusalem to Islam receive a new and central meaning. In a letter to the king of England, he admitted that he could not discuss the future of Jerusalem:

Do not resemble the king in his soul that such a waiver is possible, I would never dare to voice a word of it to the Muslims.

Eventually, after concluding the Treaty of Jaffa with Saladin in 1192, whereby Christians were granted freedom to make pilgrimages to the holy places, Richard the Lionheart departed from the Holy Land and returned to Europe.

=== Destruction of much of Jerusalem ===
With the death of Saladin in 1193, the Ayyubid Empire disintegrated and was divided among his sons. This led to struggles between various principalities as alliances were formed and dissolved. Jerusalem lost its status as the capital and religious center, and became a provincial city in an empire whose center was often Damascus or Cairo. However, for the Crusaders it remained a focus for Christian–Muslim conflict. This combination of reduced geopolitical status and inter-religious strife brought devastation to the city during the Fifth Crusade.

The Ayyubid ruler of Syria, Al-Mu'azzam decided to systematically destroy the fortifications in Jerusalem, worried the Crusaders would retake the heavily fortified city. The Sultan's command to raze much of the town to the ground seemed so implausible that it took his personal presence in Jerusalem to carry it out. The city suffered severe destruction, with all fortifications destroyed except the Tower of David, and many buildings destroyed as well. Much of the population fled the city due to the fear of living in a city without fortifications from invasion. The brother of Al-Mu'azzam, al-Malik al-Kâmil, later referred to Jerusalem post-destruction as merely "some churches and some ruined houses". The marketplace, government buildings and holy sites survived, but little else did.History of Jerusalem during the Kingdom of Jerusalem

== Christian control (1229–1244) ==
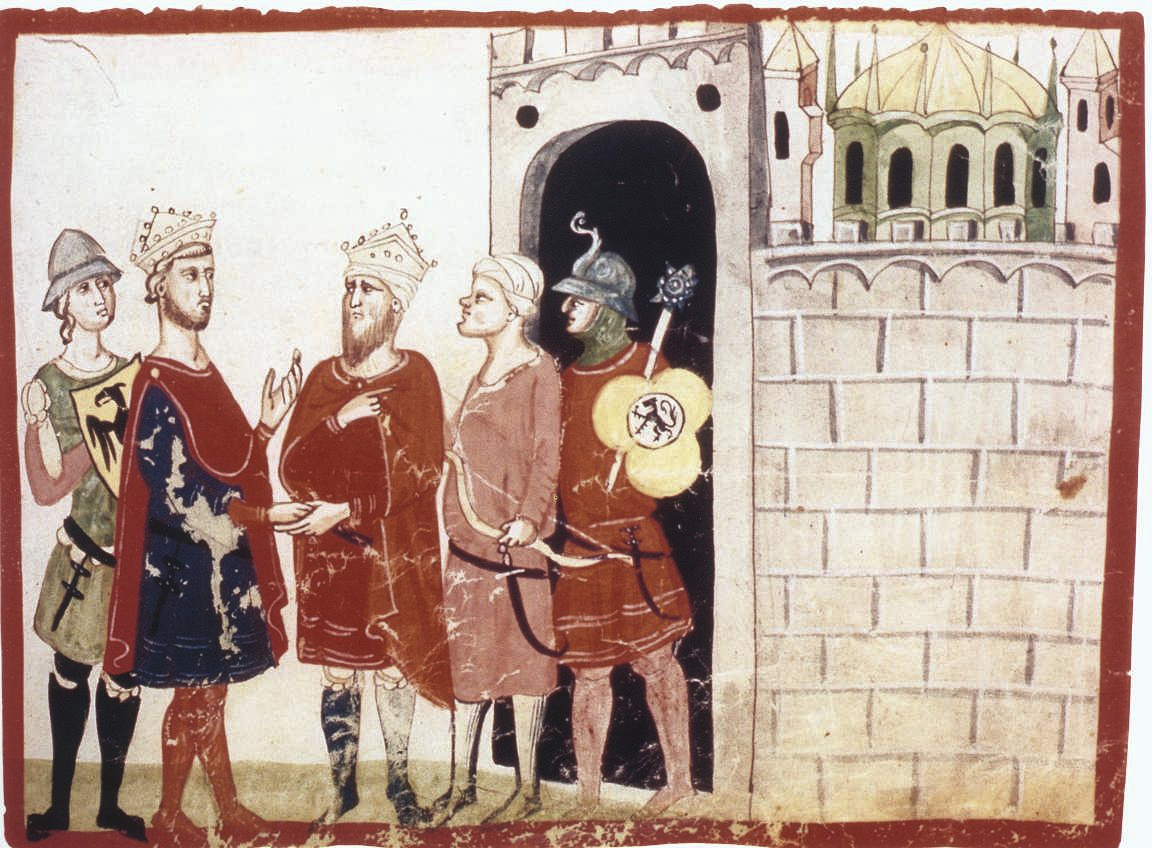
Emperor Frederick II (left) and the Egyptian sultan Malik Al-Kamil (right) meet at the walls of Jerusalem

Attempts to restore Christian power in Jerusalem during the 1190s to 1210s were unsuccessful.

The Sixth Crusade led by Frederick II, Holy Roman Emperor left Italy in 1228. The death of al-Mu'azzam negated the proposed alliance with al-Kamil, who along with his brother al-Ashraf had taken possession of Damascus (as well as Jerusalem) from their nephew, al-Mu'azzam's son an-Nasir Dawud. However, al-Kamil presumably did not know of the small size of Frederick's army, nor the divisions within it caused by his excommunication, and wished to avoid defending his territories against another crusade. Frederick's presence alone was sufficient to regain Jerusalem, Bethlehem, Nazareth, and a number of surrounding castles without a fight: these were recovered in February 1229, in return for a ten-year truce with the Ayyubids and freedom of worship for Jerusalem's Muslim inhabitants. The terms of the treaty were unacceptable to the Patriarch of Jerusalem Gerald of Lausanne, who placed the city under interdict. In March, Frederick crowned himself in the Church of the Holy Sepulchre, but because of his excommunication and the interdict Jerusalem was never truly reincorporated into the kingdom, which continued to be ruled from Acre. This period also saw the reinstatement of a ban on Jewish residence in the city, lifted only after Crusader rule ended some 15 years later.

The treaty with the Ayyubids was set to expire in 1239. Plans for a new crusade to be led by Frederick came to nothing, and Frederick himself was excommunicated by Gregory IX again in 1239. However, other European nobles took up the cause, including Theobald IV, Count of Champagne and King of Navarre, Peter of Dreux, and Amaury VI of Montfort, who arrived in Acre in September 1239. Theobald was elected leader of the crusade at a council in Acre, attended by most of the important nobles of the kingdom, including Walter of Brienne, John of Arsuf, and Balian of Sidon.

The crusaders may have been aware of the new divisions among the Ayyubids; al-Kamil had occupied Damascus in 1238 but had died soon afterwards, and his territory was inherited by his family. His sons al-Adil abu Bakr and as-Salih Ayyub inherited Egypt and Damascus.

The Ayyubids were still divided between Ayyub in Egypt, Isma'il in Damascus, and Dawud in Kerak. Isma'il, Dawud, and al-Mansur Ibrahim of Homs went to war with Ayyub, who hired the Khwarazmians to fight for him. With Ayyub's support the Khwarazmians sacked Jerusalem in the summer of 1244, leaving it in ruins and useless to both Christians and Muslims. In October, the Khwarazmians, along with the Egyptian army under the command of Baibars, were met by the Frankish army, led by Philip of Montfort, Walter of Brienne, and the masters of the Templars, Hospitallers, and Teutonic Knights, along with al-Mansur and Dawud. On October 17 the Egyptian-Khwarazmian army destroyed the Frankish-Syrian coalition, and Walter of Brienne was taken captive and later executed. By 1247, Ayyub had reoccupied most of the territory that had been conceded in 1239, and had also gained control of Damascus.

== Mamluk control after 1260 ==
There is little evidence to indicate whether or not the Mongol raids penetrated Jerusalem in either 1260 or 1300. Historical reports from the time period tend to conflict, depending on which nationality of historian was writing the report. There were also a large number of rumors and urban legends in Europe, claiming that the Mongols had captured Jerusalem and were going to return it to the Crusaders. However, these rumors turned out to be false. The general consensus of modern historians is that though Jerusalem may or may not have been subject to raids, that there was never any attempt by the Mongols to incorporate Jerusalem into their administrative system, which is what would be necessary to deem a territory "conquered" as opposed to "raided".

Even during the conflicts, pilgrims continued to come in small numbers. Pope Nicholas IV negotiated an agreement with the Mamluk sultan to allow Latin clergy to serve in the Church of the Holy Sepulchre. With the Sultan's agreement, Pope Nicholas, a Franciscan himself, sent a group of friars to keep the Latin liturgy going in Jerusalem. With the city little more than a backwater, they had no formal quarters, and simply lived in a pilgrim hostel, until in 1300 King Robert of Sicily gave a large gift of money to the Sultan. Robert asked that the Franciscans be allowed to have the Sion Church, the Mary Chapel in the Holy Sepulchre, and the Nativity Cave, and the Sultan gave his permission. But the remainder of the Christian holy places were kept in decay.

Mamluk sultans made a point of visiting the city, endowing new buildings, encouraging Muslim settlement, and expanding mosques. During the reign of Sultan Baibars, the Mamluks renewed the Muslim alliance with the Jews and he established two new sanctuaries, one to Moses and one to Salih, to encourage numerous Muslim and Jewish pilgrims to be in the area at the same time as the Christians, who filled the city during Easter. In 1267 Nahmanides (also known as Ramban) made aliyah. In the Old City he established the Ramban Synagogue, the oldest active synagogue in Jerusalem. However, the city had no great political power, and was in fact considered by the Mamluks as a place of exile for out-of-favor officials. The city itself was ruled by a low-ranking emir.

== See also ==
- Old City (Jerusalem)

== Bibliography ==
- Adler, Nathan Marcus (1907). The Itinerary of Benjamin of Tudela: Critical Text, Translation and Commentary. New York: Phillip Feldheim, Inc – via washington.edu. The page numbers cited are from the 1960 reprint by the Hebrew University – Department of History of Israel.
- Amitai, Reuven (1987). "Mongol Raids into Palestine (A.D. 1260 and 1300)". The Journal of the Royal Asiatic Society of Great Britain and Ireland. 119 (2). Cambridge, UK; New York, USA: Cambridge University Press: 236–255. doi:10.1017/S0035869X0014064X. JSTOR 25212151.
- Armstrong, Karen (2015) [1996]. Jerusalem: One City, Three Faiths. Ballantine Books, Random House. pp. 307–308. ISBN 978-0-345-39168-1.
- Asbridge, Thomas S. (2004). The First Crusade: A New History. Oxford University Press. ISBN 9780195178234.
- Boas, Adrian J. (2001). Jerusalem in the Time of the Crusades: Society, Landscape and Art in the Holy City Under Frankish Rule. Routledge. ISBN 978-1-134-58272-3.
- Bréhier, Louis René. (1908). "Latin Kingdom of Jerusalem (1099-1291)". In Herbermann, Charles (ed.). Catholic Encyclopedia. 8. New York: Robert Appleton Company.
- Dajani-Shakeel, Hadia (1988). Hisham Nashabe (ed.). Some Medieval Accounts of Salah al-Din's Recovery of Jerusalem (Al-Quds): The Surrender of Jerusalem. Beirut: Institute for Palestine Studies – via The Internet Medieval Sourcebook, History Department of Fordham University, New York.
- Prawer, Joshua (1963). תולדות ממלכת הצלבנים בארץ ישראל [A History of the Latin Kingdom of Jerusalem] (in Hebrew). Vol. II. Jerusalem: Bialik Institute.
- Prawer, Joshua; Ben-Shammai, Haggai, eds. (1991). ספר ירושלים: התקופה הצלבנית והאיובית [The History of Jerusalem: Crusaders and Ayyubids (1099–1250)] (in Hebrew). Jerusalem: Yad Ben Zvi. ISBN 9789652170927.
  - Prawer, Joshua. שלטון הצלבנים [approx. meaning: Crusader rule]. p. 29.
  - Prawer, Joshua. היישוב היהודי [The Jewish Community]. p. 201.
  - Sivan, Emmanuel. [Translated title: The Sanctity of Jerusalem in Islam During the Crusader Period]. p. 297.
- Riley-Smith, Jonathan S. C. (2005). The Crusades: A History (2nd ed.). A&C Black. ISBN 9780826472694.
- Savona-Ventura, Charles (2005) The Domus Leprosorum in Crusader Jerusalem Archived 2016-03-03 at the Wayback Machine. Accessed July 2020.
- Schein, Sylvia (1979). "Gesta Dei per Mongolos 1300: The Genesis of a Non-Event". The English Historical Review. 94 (373). Oxford University Press: 805–819. doi:10.1093/ehr/XCIV.CCCLXXIII.805. JSTOR 565554.
- Schein, Sylvia (2006)."Jerusalem, City of". In The Crusades – An Encyclopedia. pp. 656–661.
- Setton, Kenneth M.; Baldwin, Marshall W., eds. (1969) [1955]. A History of the Crusades. Vol. I. The First Hundred Years. Madison: The University of Wisconsin Press. ISBN 9780299048341.
  - Fink, Harold S., Chapter XII, "The Foundations of the Latin States, 1099-1118" Archived 2024-06-03 at the Wayback Machine, pp. 368–409.
  - Nicholson, Robert L. Chapter XIII, "The Growth of the Latin States, 1118-1144" Archived 2024-03-27 at the Wayback Machine, pp. 410–447.
  - Baldwin, Marshall W. Chapter XIX, "The Decline and Fall of Jerusalem, 1174-1189" Archived 2023-06-01 at the Wayback Machine, pp. 590–621.
- Setton, Kenneth M.; Baldwin, Marshall W.; Hazard, Harry Williams, eds. (1969) [1962]. A History of the Crusades. Vol. II. The Later Crusades 1187-1311. Madison: The University of Wisconsin Press. ISBN 0299048446.
  - Hardwicke, Mary Nickerson. Chapter XV: The Crusader States, 1192-1243 (PDF). pp. 519–555. Archived from the original (PDF) on 28 March 2024.
  - Runciman, Sir Steven. Chapter XVI: The Crusader States, 1243-1291 (PDF). pp. 557–598. Archived from the original (PDF) on 18 October 2021.
- Tyerman, Christopher (2006). "24: Louis IX and the Fall of Mainland Outremer 1244-91". God's War: A New History of the Crusades. Harvard University Press. pp. 770–771. ISBN 9780674023871.
