= Popular Republican Union of Gironde =

French conservative Catholic party

The Popular Republican Union of Gironde (UPR; French: "Union Populaire Républicaine de la Gironde") was a small right-wing Catholic party active in the department of Gironde, France, between 1925 and the end of the 1930s. The UPR was affiliated with the Republican Federation, the largest conservative French party of the interwar period.

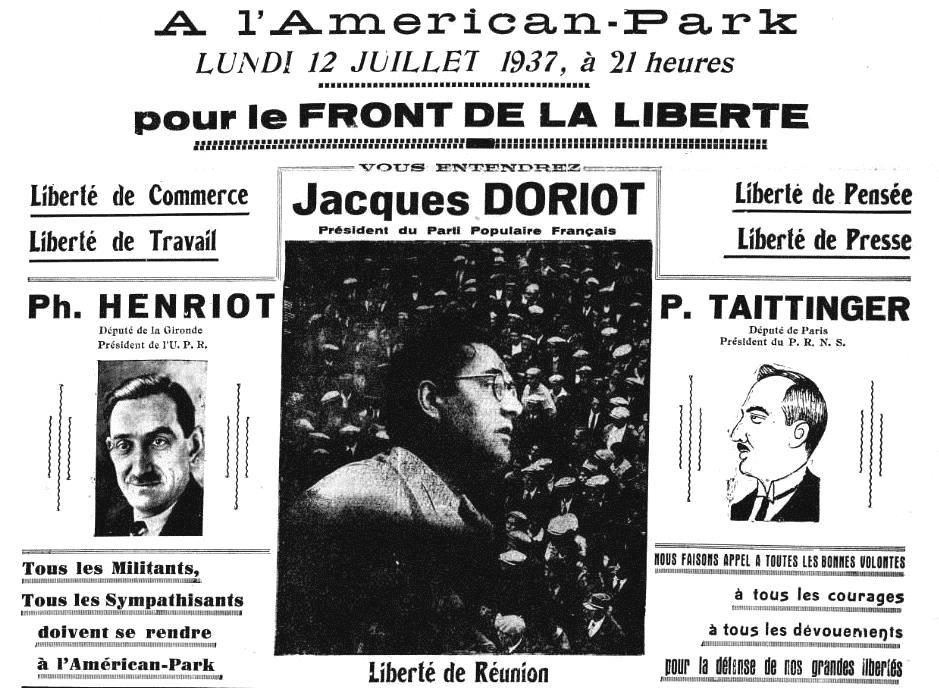
Announcement of the meeting of the Freedom Front in Bordeaux on 12 July 1937.

The party was founded in 1925, six years after the birth of the Alsatian Popular Republican Union. Both organizations shared clerical and conservative stances, and opposed the Cartel des Gauches which had won the 1924 legislative election. Chaired by Father Bergey, priest of Saint-Émilion and member of Parliament, and supported by Cardinal Pierre Andrieu, the UPR displayed a program reflecting the concerns of the Catholic right, in the continuity of the Fédération Nationale Catholique. The party defended private education against the laïque "single school" project and endorsed the right to vote for women, at that time considered more clerical than men.

The party had 7,200 supporters in the eve of the 1928 legislative election. Initially the head of propaganda, then deputy president, Philippe Henriot succeeded Bergey as president of the UPR following the 1932 legislative election. Opposed to the Popular Front, the party moved further right and participated in the short-lived anti-communist alliance Freedom Front, along with the fascist French Popular Party and Jeunesses Patriotes.
