= Hospital of Saint John (Jerusalem) =

11th-century hospice in Jerusalem, Israel

The Hospital of Saint John was a hospice established by merchants from the Italian city of Amalfi in the second half of the 11th century for male Christian pilgrims visiting Jerusalem.

== Background ==
Christian pilgrims have regularly visited the Holy Land of Palestine since the early Christian period. (Note: The first known Christian pilgrim Bishop Melito of Sardis visited Roman Palestine in the second half of the 2nd century AD.) With its famed shrines, such as the empty tomb of Jesus, the city of Jerusalem has always been an especially popular destination of pilgrimages. Christian holy places were placed under official protection all over the Roman Empire during the reign of the first Christian emperor, Constantine the Great (r. 306–337). In sites associated with Jesus's life and ministry, churches were built, among them, the Church of the Holy Sepulchre on the site of Jesus's tomb where he was thought to have risen from the dead. The massive influx of pilgrims to Jerusalem entailed the establishment of institutions, such as monasteries and hospices, to accommodate them and to care for the sick and injured. A hospice for western European, or Latin, pilgrims was likely founded in 603 by Pope Gregory I, according to the historian Jonathan Riley-Smith.

Jerusalem was conquered in 614 by the Sasanian Empire. Although the Eastern Romans, or Byzantines, reconquered the city, it was captured by Muslim troops after a prolonged siege in March 638. As Christianity remained a tolerated religion in the Muslim Caliphate, Christian pilgrimages to Jerusalem continued, but the number of Latin pilgrims radically decreased due to the decline of trade connections between western Europe and the Muslim world. Only the rich could finance an expensive journey to the Holy Land, and those who reached it, such as the bishop Arculf from Francia, had to endure immense hardships. From the 8th century, the use of penitentials—handbooks about the acts of penance that sinners were expected to perform—reinforced the western Christians' enthusiasm for pilgrimages, for these manuals regarded penitential journeys as an effective form of self-mortification. The increasing number of western pilgrims prompted the Frankish king Charlemagne (r. 768–814) to establish a hostel for them in Jerusalem. In the next century, Arab and Viking raids hindered voyages to Palestine, but the development of the Byzantine navy and the destruction of Arab bridgeheads in Italy and in Francia stabilised the Mediterranean by the early 10th century. Dozens of prominent western clerics and aristocrats (men and women alike) travelled to the Holy Land, and they were often accompanied by commoners who joined their entourage in the hope of their protection. (Note: Among the most prominent pilgrims, Judith, Duchess of Bavaria visited the Holy Land in 970; Conrad, the saintly bishop of Constance went three times to Palestine; and the warlike Count of Anjou, Fulk Nerra (r. 987–1040) made three penitential pilgrimages.)

In the early 11th century, trans-Mediterranean trade was dominated by Muslim and Jewish merchants, but by the end of the century they were replaced by merchants from Italian cities, such as Amalfi, Genoa, and Venice. This was the consequence of both economic and political factors. These cities' agricultural hinterland was small, thus their burghers eagerly invested in the lucrative trade in slaves and competitive manufactured goods (such as linen) with northern Africa and the Levant. The Italian cities developed their own fleets and quickly overcame their competitors. Western Europe greatly benefitted from the Medieval Warm Period, whereas the Levant was hit by severe droughts. Prosperity increased the demand for luxury goods (such as ivory and spices) in western Europe, which also enriched the Italian traders. The century also saw the development of new religious communities, and also of charitable institutions for old or ill people.

== Establishment ==
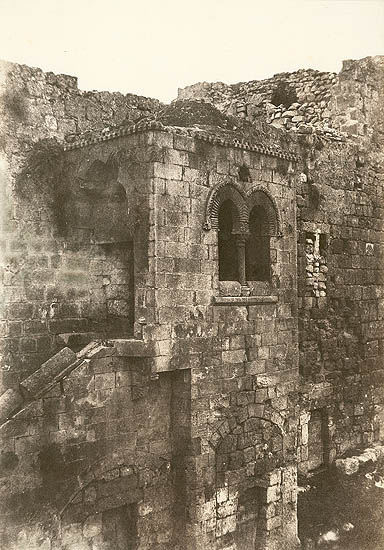
Ruins of the Church of Saint Mary of the Latins, established by merchants from Amalfi in Jerusalem

Writing between 1170 and 1184, the historian William of Tyre says that merchants from Amalfi approached the Fatimid caliph asking a plot of land in Jerusalem's Christian Quarter because they had no house in the Holy City. The caliph granted them a parcel in the vicinity of the Holy Sepulchre. Here they built a monastery, dedicating it to Mary, mother of Jesus, thus it was called Saint Mary of the Latins. In time, a nunnery was established nearby in honour of Mary Magdalene to accommodate female pilgrims. The monastery also established a xenodochium (hospice) for the benefit of needy and ailing visitors from western Europe. Riley-Smith assumes that William wrongly attributes the establishment of two of the three institutions to the Amalfitans, since Benedictine monks had administered a Saint Mary Church near the Holy Sepulchre possibly as early as Charlemagne's time, and the hospice for Latin pilgrims still existed towards the end of the 9th century. He says that the Amalfitan merchants actually renovated previous structures. William claims that the hospice's own church was built in honour of John the Merciful, but modern historians agree that he must be wrong, for the Amalfi Cathedral was dedicated to Jesus's mother and John the Baptist. Riley-Smith says that William's story may have "echoed some early dispute about the patronage" of the Hospitallers (the religious confraternity that would develop in the hospice).

The late-11th-century existence of a hospice is confirmed by independent sources. A papal bull issued in 1112 in favour of Saint Mary of the Latins refers to a hospice staffed by Benedictine monks that was established by the monastery for "Latins, Italians, and Lombards" before the First Crusade. The Vetus Chronicon Amalphitanum narrates that during his pilgrimage to Jerusalem c. 1080, John, Archbishop of Amalfi, met with merchants from his hometown who had established two hospices, one for male and another for female pilgrims, there. Other southern Italian chronicles add that the head of an Amalfitan family, Mauro urged the establishment of hospices in both Jerusalem and Antioch.

== Sources ==
- Nicholson, Helen (2001). The Knights Hospitaller. The Boydell Press. ISBN 978-0-85115-845-7.
- Lock, Peter (2006). The Routledge Companion to the Crusades. Routledge Companion to History. Routledge. ISBN 978-0-415-39312-6.
- Riley-Smith, Jonathan (1967). The Knights of St. John in Jerusalem and Cyprus, c. 1050–1310. A History of the Order of the Hospital of St. John of Jerusalem. Vol. One. Macmillan Publishers; St. Martin's Press. OCLC 179663.
- Runciman, Sir Steven (1969). "The Pilgrimages to Palestine before 1095". In Baldwin, Marshall W. (ed.). The First Hundred Years. A History of the Crusades. Vol. One (second ed.). The University of Wisconsin Press. pp. 68–78. ISBN 978-0-299-04834-1.
- Tyerman, Christopher (2019). The World of the Crusades: An Illustrated History. Yale University Press. ISBN 978-0-300-21739-1.
