= Jean Guiraud =

French historian and journalist

Jean-Baptiste Guiraud
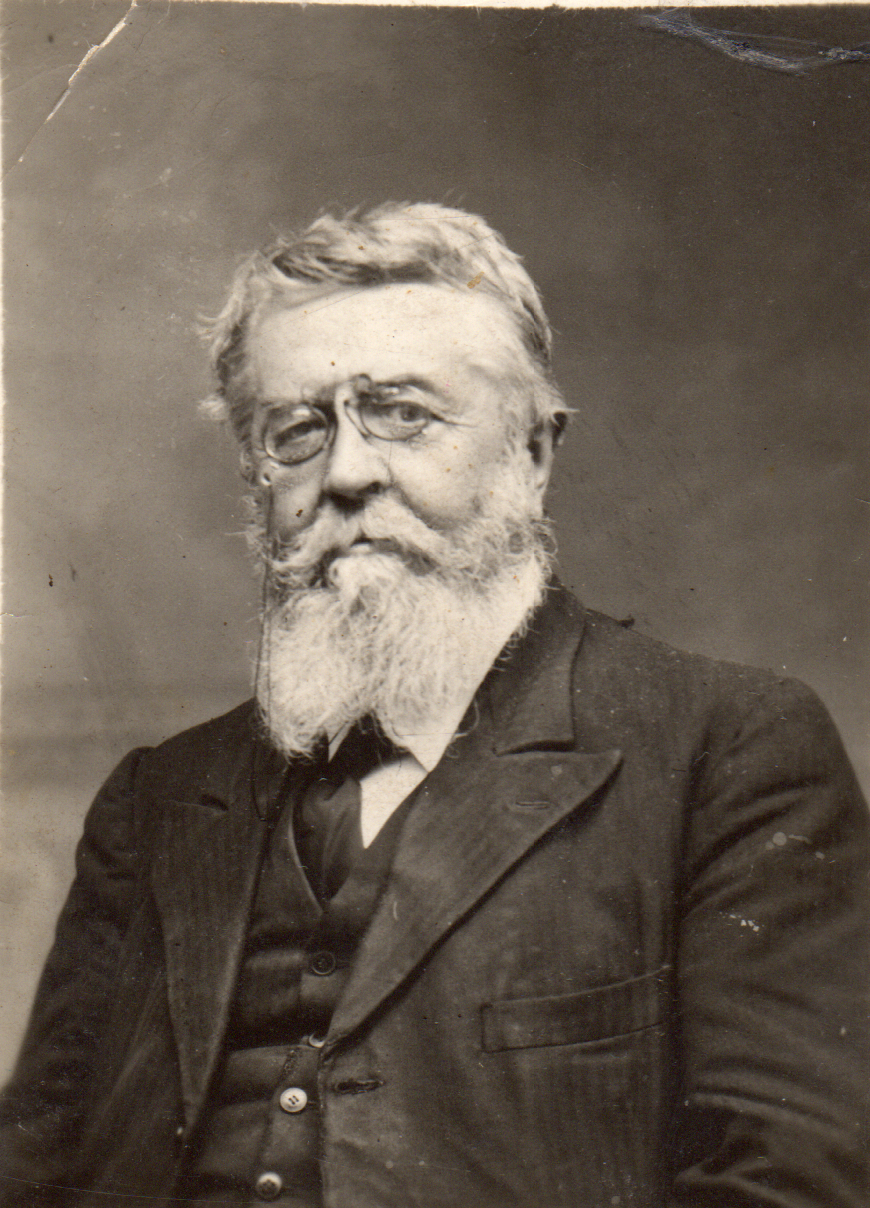
- Born: 24 June 1866; Quillan, Aude, France
- Died: 11 December 1953 (aged 87); Saint-Martin-de-Bréthencourt, Yvelines, France
- Occupations: Historian, newspaper editor

Jean-Baptiste Guiraud (24 June 1866 – 11 December 1953) was a French historian and journalist. For many years he was co-editor of the Catholic journal La Croix. He was a prolific author and wrote many books on historical and other subjects.

== Life ==
=== Early years ===
Jean Guiraud was born in Quillan, Aude, on 24 June 1866, son of a teacher. His elder brother, Paul, became actively anti-clerical. Jean chose to support the Catholic church throughout his life. He studied at the École normale supérieure. He obtained his agrégation in History and Geography in 1888, then spent three years in the French School in Rome, where he helped edit the Papal records of the 13th century. In 1892 he was appointed professor of history at the lycée in Sens, Yonne. In 1895 he married Marguerite Petit de Julleville, who would give him ten children. In 1898 he was appointed professor at the University of Besançon, taking the chair of History and Geography of Antiquity and the Middle Ages.

=== Journalism and politics ===
In parallel to his teaching career Guiraud undertook historical research, and promoted free education. In 1903 he helped found the daily newspaper L’Éclair comtois. In 1905 he became chairman of the Doubs committee of Popular Liberal Action. From 1908 he was editor in chief of the Revue des questions historiques. In 1909 he founded his own newsletter, Dieu, patrie, Liberté (God, Fatherland, Liberty). After two failures to be elected, Guiraud withdrew from politics and became chair of the Association of Family Heads of the departments of Doubs, Haute-Saône and Territoire de Belfort. At the same time he organized a national union of family heads.

=== Co-editor of La Croix ===
At the end of 1916 Guiraud accepted the position of co-editor with father Georges Bertoye of the Assumptionist journal La Croix. He succeeded Jules Bouvattier, who had held this position since 1897. From 1921 he regularly wrote in the literary pages, where he criticized François Mauriac, Marcel Proust and Charles Péguy, whom he detested. He had difficulty agreeing with the papal condemnation of the right-wing Action Française. As head of the Associations Catholiques de Chefs de Famille he supported the Fédération Nationale Catholique and advertised its meetings in his columns in La Croix.

In the early 1920s there was heated debate between proponents of the repartition proportionelle scolaire, which would allow for state-supported religious schools, and the école unique in which all state schools would be secular. The deputy François Albert became president of the Ligue de l'enseignement (Education League) shortly before being appointed Minister of Public Education in Édouard Herriot's mainly Radical government in 1924. At the annual meeting of the Ligue de l'enseignement in Valence on 1 November 1924 Albert gave a speech in which he violently attacked the Jesuits. Guiraud described Albert as "uniting in his person the action of masonry and official action in national education". Guiraud said the école unique was "a sectarian enterprise that aims at establishing the monopoly of the atheist state."

Guiraud avoided writing about the victory of the left-wing Popular Front in 1936. Eventually his disagreements with the Assumptionists were too great, and in November 1939 he resigned. Jean Guiraud died on 11 December 1953 in Saint-Martin-de-Bréthencourt, Yvelines.

== Books ==
- Jean Guiraud (1892–1898). Les registres de Grégoire X, 1272-1276 (in French). Paris: Thorin et fils : [puis] A. Fontemoing. p. 425.
- Jean Guiraud (1895). L'État pontifical après le grand schisme : étude de géographie politique (in French). Paris: E. Thorin. p. 251. OL 18231511M.
- Jean Guiraud (1896). De Prulianem Monasterio ordinis Praedicatorum incunabulis (1206-1345) (in Latin). A. Fontemoing. p. 181. OL 24872844M.
- Jean Guiraud (1899). Saint Dominique (in French). Lecoffre. p. 212. OL 24789186M.
- Jean Guiraud (1901–1904). Les Registres d'Urbain IV (in French). 4 volumes. Paris: A. Fontemoing.
- Jean Guiraud (1902). L'Église romaine et les origines de la Renaissance (in French). Paris: V. Lecoffre.
- Jean Guiraud (1902). Questions d'Histoire et d'Archéologie (in French). Lecoffre. pp. 304.
- Jean Guiraud (1906). La Séparation et les élections (in French). Paris: Lecoffre. p. 436.
- Jean Guiraud (1907). Le Cartulaire de Notre-Dame de Prouille, précédé d'une étude sur L'albigéisme languedocien aux XIIe & XIIIe siècles (in French). 2 volumes. Picard.
- Jean Guiraud (1911–1917). Histoire partiale, histoire vraie (in French). 4 volumes. Beauchesne.
- Jean Guiraud (1917). Clergé et Congrégations au service de la France (in French). Éditions des Questions actuelles. p. 552.
- Jean Guiraud (1919). Vers l'Union pour l'Action (in French). Bonne Presse. p. 550.
- Jean Guiraud (1926). La critique en face d'un mauvais livre (in French). Paris: Guillemot Lamothe. p. 131.
- Jean Guiraud (1928). L'inquisition médiévale (in French). Grasset. pp. 251 pages. OL 14028354M.
- Jean Guiraud (1928). Pourquoi je suis catholique (in French). Édition de France. p. 104.
- Jean Guiraud (1933). Monseigneur Freppel (in French). Paris: Flammarion. p. 243.
- Jean Guiraud (1935–1938). Histoire de l'Inquisition au Moyen Âge (in French). 2 volumes. Paris: A. Picard.
- Jean Guiraud (2012). Brigitte Waché (ed.). Souvenirs de jeunesse 1866-1900 (in French). autobiography. Université de Savoie. p. 680. ISBN 978-2919732050.

== Sources ==
- Arnal, Oscar L. (1985-04-15). Ambivalent Alliance: The Catholic Church and the Action Française, 1899-1939. University of Pittsburgh Pre. p. 95. ISBN 978-0-8229-7705-6.
- "GUIRAUD (Jean) et sa famille" (in French). Archives nationales.
- Pitette, Yves (2006-11-11). "Jean Guiraud, un polémiste rédacteur en chef de 'La Croix'". La Croix (in French).
- Talbott, John E. (2015-12-08). The Politics of Educational Reform in France, 1918-1940. Princeton University Press. ISBN 978-1-4008-7628-0.
