= B. R. Bruss =

French novelist

René Bonnefoy (16 December 1896, Lempdes-sur-Allagnon – 30 December 1980), known by the pseudonyms B. R. Bruss and Roger Blondel, was a French science fiction and fantasy writer. Before his career as a writer, he had been a journalist and a civil servant for the Nazi collaborationist Vichy regime (1940–44).

== Biography ==
=== Vichy collaborationist (1940–1944) ===
Bonnefoy was the editor-in-chief of the Moniteur du Puy-de-Dôme, a newspaper bought by Pierre Laval in 1927.

After Pierre Laval dismissed the team of Je Suis Partout from Radio-Vichy in September 1940 due to their extremism, he entrusted the journalism to Bonnefoy, who became responsible for developing the themes of the Révolution Nationale by radio. Upon the return of Laval to power in April 1942, Bonnefoy replaced Paul Marion—then in charge of Information for the Vichy government—as the manager of press control. In liaison with Louis Darquier de Pellepoix, Bonnefoy expelled Jewish teachers from universities and created a professorship concerning the history of Judaism at the Sorbonne University, entrusted to Henri Labroue. After the liberation of France, he went into hiding and was sentenced to death in absentia in 1946.

=== Novelist (1946–1980) ===
While still in hiding, Bonnefoy reinvented himself as a successful science fiction and fantasy writer, using a pseudonym. His first novel, Et la planète sauta..., was published in 1946. In 1955, he surrendered to the authorities and obtained a retrial for his activities during the war. He avoided being sent to prison but was sentenced to five years of national indignity. In 1956, he released the novel Le Mouton Enragé using the pseudonym Roger Blondel, adapted to the cinema in 1974 as Love at the Top and featuring Jean-Louis Trintignant and Jane Birkin. He remained a regular contributor to the science-fiction collection Fleuve Noir Anticipation. His other well known novels include Bradfer et l'éternel (1964), Un endroit nommé la vie (1973) and Graffiti (1975). In 1978, he declared to the magazine Nouvelles littéraires: "I took the non-serious as center of gravity. The central subject of all my fables is the definition of the primordial sputtering. The one which is spontaneous, banal, overabundant, the one we hear in the street, at the coffee shops, in the subway, all these sonorous graffiti that show us daily that our world is empty..."

He was the father of literary critic Claude Bonnefoy.

== Selected works ==
=== Science fiction ===
- Et la Planète Sauta... (1946)
- L'Apparition des Surhommes (1951)
- S.O.S. Soucoupes (1954)
- L'Anneau des Djarfs (1961)
- Le Grand Feu (1964)
- La Planéte Glacée (1965)
- L'Espionne Galactique (1967)
- Le Grand Marginal (1971)
- Penelcoto (1975)
- Les Espaces enchevetrés (1979)

=== Fantasy ===
- L'oeil était dans la tombe (1955)
- Maléfices (1956)
- Nous avons tout peur (1956)
- Terreur en plein soleil (1958)
- Le Tambour d'angoisse (1962)
- Le Bourg Envouté (1964)
- La Figurine de plomb (1965)
- Le Mort qu'il faut tuer (1971)
- L'Objet maléfique (1972)
