= Julian Grenier =

13th-century crusader and count of Sidon

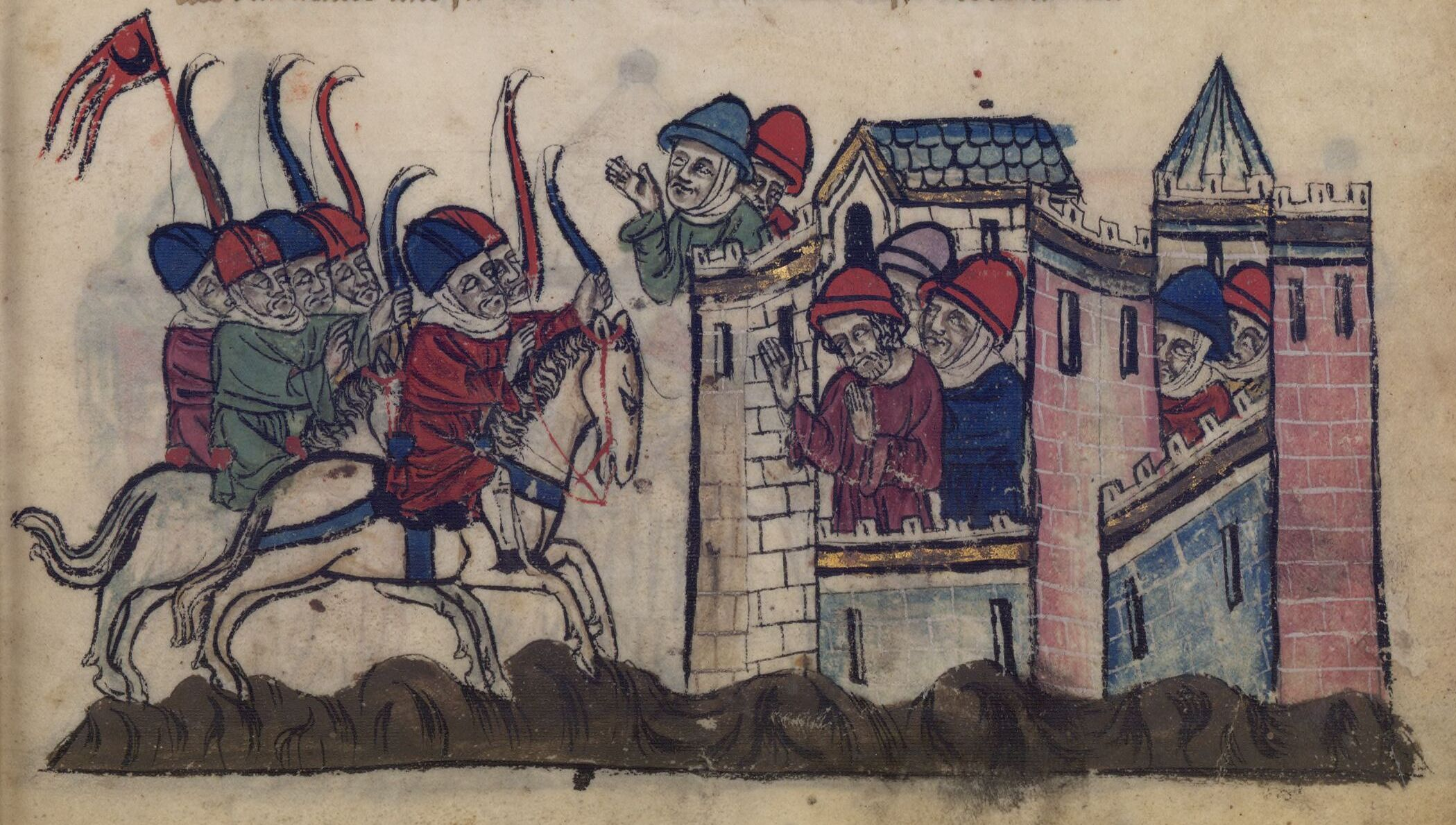
Siege of Sidon: Kitbuqa vs. Julian Grenier in 1260. From Hayton of Corycus, Fleur des histoires d'orient.

Julian Grenier (died 1275) was the count of Sidon from 1239 to 1260, then becoming merely titular. He was the son and successor of Balian Grenier and Ida of Reynel. He did not exhibit the wisdom of his father in his dealings with the Saracens.

In 1260, he attacked adjacent areas of Damascus, killing a Mongol officer in the process. The officer was the nephew of Kitbuqa, Mongol general of Hulagu Khan. The Mongols avenged themselves by ravaging the territory of Sidon and sacked the castle. But Julian had already left the area beyond the sea. Julian, in response, sold the county to the Knights Templar. Ruined by the sale, he entered the order of the Temple himself.

In 1252, he married Euphemia, daughter of Hethum I, King of Armenia. He had an affair with Isabella of Ibelin, Queen of Cyprus, possibly prompting a papal letter, De sinu patris, condemning the relationship. With Euphemia he had three children:

- Balian II, who died at Botron in 1277
- John, died in Armenia in 1289
- Margaret, married Guy II Embriaco

== Sources ==
- Setton, Kenneth M. (general editor) A History of the Crusades: Volume II — The Later Crusades, 1189 – 1311. Robert Lee Wolff and Harry W. Hazard, editors. University of Wisconsin Press: Milwaukee, 1969.
