= Love at the Top =

1974 film by Michel Deville

- Theatrical release poster
- French: Le Mouton enragé
- Directed by: Michel Deville
- Screenplay by: Christopher Frank
- Based on: Le Mouton enragé by Roger Blondel
- Produced by: Léo L. Fuchs
- Starring: Jean-Louis Trintignant; Jean-Pierre Cassel; Romy Schneider; Jane Birkin; Florinda Bolkan; Henri Garcin; Georges Wilson
- Cinematography: Claude Lecomte
- Edited by: Raymonde Guyot
- Music by: Saint-Saëns
- Production companies: Viaduc Productions; T.R.A.C.
- Distributed by: S.N. Prodis
- Release dates: 13 March 1974 (France); 14 March 1974 (Italy)
- Running time: 105 minutes
- Countries: France; Italy
- Language: French

Love at the Top (French: Le Mouton enragé, lit. 'The Rabid Sheep') is a 1974 satirical comedy-drama film directed by Michel Deville from a screenplay by Christopher Frank, based on the 1956 novel Le Mouton enragé by Roger Blondel.

== Plot ==
Nicolas Mallet is a modest bank employee resigned to social mediocrity for the security that his job gives him. Introverted and dull, with the assistance and under the guidance of a former high school friend, novelist Claude Fabre, he will become a confident seducer, an opportunist upstart with no defined ambition. In the aftermath of the oil crisis, the Bel Ami of the 1970s experienced a remarkable social rise, relying exclusively on women whom he seduced almost unwittingly, while being remotely guided by Fabre. Going to seek power from those who rule him, knowing how to make himself indispensable, he will succeed in his ascent and favor that of his first conquest. It is only at the end of the film that we discover the real reasons behind Fabre's manipulative attitude.

== Cast ==
- Jean-Louis Trintignant as Nicolas Mallet
- Jean-Pierre Cassel as Claude Fabre
- Romy Schneider as Roberte Groult
- Florinda Bolkan as Flora Danieli
- Jane Birkin as Marie-Paule
- Henri Garcin as Berthoud
- Michel Vitold as Georges Groult
- Jean-François Balmer as Vischenko
- Dominique Constanza as Sabine
- Betty Berr as Sylvie
- Georges Beller as Marie-Paule's friend
- Estella Blain as Shirley Douglas
- Mary Marquet as M^{me} Hermens
- Georges Wilson as Lourceuil
- Gisèle Casadesus as M^{me} Lourceuil
