= Radio Nationale (France) =

French collaborationist radio station

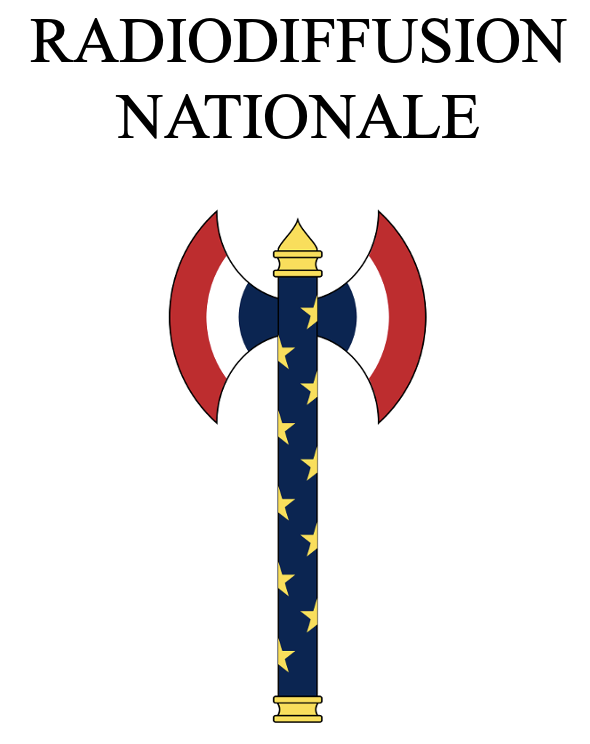

Radio nationale, commonly called Radio-Vichy, was a radio station operated by the Vichy government of France between 6 July 1940 and 26 August 1944.

The armistice of 22 June 1940 signed by officials of Nazi Germany and the French Third Republic outlawed all French radio broadcasts in Nazi-occupied France and made those active in the Zone libre subject to special authorization. Philippe Pétain, leader of the collaborationist Vichy state, obtained from the Germans the creation of two radio stations in the Zone libre: Radio nationale in 1940 and La Voix de la France in 1941.

Radio nationale broadcast from the Vichy Casino, hence its nickname Radio-Vichy. Pro-Nazi journalists from the antisemitic weekly Je suis partout—Alain Laubreaux and Lucien Rebatet, working under the direction of Jean-Louis Tixier-Vignancour—were among the founders, and gave through their programs an extremist image of the Vichy regime among the French, contradicting the initial Pétainist strategy. As the head of Radio-Vichy, Tixier-Vignancour offered a large broadcast time to collaborationist Marcel Déat. Concerned not to shock the listeners with excessive propaganda, Pierre Laval eventually dismissed the team in September 1940. Laval entrusted the direction of information to René Bonnefoy, who became in charge of developing the themes of the Révolution Nationale over the radio.

In the summer of 1940, a "radio war" (guerre des ondes) broke out, marked by oratory battles between the "totalitarian radio stations" (Radio Paris and Radio-Vichy) and the "resistant" BBC and Radio Londres which increased the power of their transmitters and the intensity of slogans, in response to radio jamming and threats to listeners by the Germans. From 1942, Philippe Henriot was the main propagandist of the station.

On 26 August 1944, the French Forces of the Interior invaded the recording studio of Radio Nationale in the city of Vichy, which definitively ceased broadcasting.
