= Helvis of Ibelin =

French noble

Helvis of Ibelin (after 1178 – before 1 June 1216) was a daughter of Balian of Ibelin and his wife, Maria Komnene, who was the dowager Queen of Jerusalem. Helvis was a member of the House of Ibelin. She was lady of Sidon by marriage.

== Life ==
Helvis' mother was the widow of King Amalric of Jerusalem, which made Helvis a half-sister of Queen Isabella I of Jerusalem. Helvis was one of four siblings: although their order of birth is uncertain, the manuscripts of the Lignages d'Outremer suggest she was the elder daughter, and possibly the eldest child.

Helvis' siblings were John of Ibelin, the Old Lord of Beirut, Margaret of Ibelin, and Philip of Ibelin, Regent of Cyprus.

Helvis spent her early life in Jerusalem, though during Saladin's siege of the city in 1187, Helvis, her mother and siblings were escorted to live in Tripoli. Her father Balian remained in Jerusalem and negotiated its surrender to Saladin, but joined his family in Tripoli afterward. They then went to Tyre, where they formed the strongest support for Conrad of Montferrat, who married Helvis's half-sister Queen Isabella in November 1190.

=== First marriage ===
Helvis firstly married Reginald of Sidon, a widower over forty years her senior. Reginald had been imprisoned by Saladin and married Helvis soon after his release in April 1190.

The couple had the following children:

- Agnes, married Raoul (Ralph) de Saint-Omer of Tiberias, seneschal of Jerusalem (stepson of Raymond III of Tripoli). (However, only one MS of the Lignages d'Outremer explicitly states that she was Helvis's daughter; given her first name, she may have been from Reginald's previous marriage to Agnes of Courtenay.)
- Fenie (Euphemia), married Eudes (Odo) de Saint-Omer of Tiberias, Constable of Tripoli, Lord of Gogulat (stepson of Raymond III of Tripoli, brother of Raoul).
- Balian, who married Margaret of Brienne, and succeeded Reginald in Sidon in 1202.

Reginald died in 1202, leaving Helvis a widow.

=== Second marriage ===
When Guy of Montfort arrived at Jaffa, he took part in King Aimery's expedition into Galilee. Aimery rewarded Guy's service by arranging his marriage to Helvis. They married in 1204.

The couple had the following children:

- Philip, who stayed in the Holy Land and became Lord of Tyre
- Pernelle, who became a nun at the abbey of Saint-Antoine des Champs in Paris

The couple were married for twelve years before Helvis' death in 1214. She had five children in total.

== Sources ==
- Ambroise (2003). Barber, Malcolm (ed.). The History of the Holy War. Translated by Ailes, Marianne. The Boydell Press.
- Edbury, Peter W. (2001). "The De Montforts in the Latin East". In Prestwich, Michael; Britnell, R. H.; Frame, Robin (eds.). Thirteenth Century England VIII: Proceedings of the Durham Conference 1999. The Boydell Press.
- Peter W. Edbury, John of Ibelin and the Kingdom of Jerusalem, Woodbridge, 1997.
- Marie-Adélaïde Nielen (ed.), Lignages d'Outremer, Académie des inscriptions et belles-lettres, 1993.
- Reinhold Röhricht (ed.), Regesta Regni Hierosolymitani MXCVII-MCCXCI, and Additamentum, Berlin, 1893–1904.
- William of Tyre, A History of Deeds Done Beyond the Sea. E. A. Babcock and A. C. Krey, trans. Columbia University Press, 1943.
