= Fédération Nationale Catholique =

- Old badge of the Federation
- Formation: 1924
- Dissolved: 1944
- Type: Lobby group
- Region served: France
- Official language: French
- President: General Édouard de Curières de Castelnau

The Fédération Nationale Catholique (FNC) (English: National Catholic Federation) was a French movement that was active in the 1920s and 1930s, with the purpose of defending the Catholic Church against secular trends in the governments of the time. The Federation was founded in 1924 in response to the election of a left-wing government with a secularist policy. After rapidly gaining members and staging large demonstrations, it soon achieved its goal of maintaining the status quo separation between church and state. The movement gradually lost momentum in the years that followed, although it remained in existence during the Vichy regime.

== Formation ==
The anti-religious Cartel des Gauches (Left-wing coalition) won the 1924 French national elections and formed a government led by Édouard Herriot. Under pressure to launch an anti-clerical program, Herriot closed the Vatican embassy and passed legislation enforcing secular education in Alsace-Lorraine. In response General Noël Édouard, vicomte de Curières de Castelnau organized the Fédération Nationale Catholique to defend the church against the laicists.

The movement had little concern with the form of government, which could be a monarchy or a republic, but considered that all the evils of modern society resulted from the absence of God. Politics were viewed from a Catholic perspective. The Federation was supported by the church hierarchy in France. Jean Guiraud, head of the Associations Catholiques de Chefs de Famille, supported the Federation and advertised its meetings in his columns in La Croix. The right-wing Action Française gave the FNC much support in its defense of religious liberty.

== Early success ==
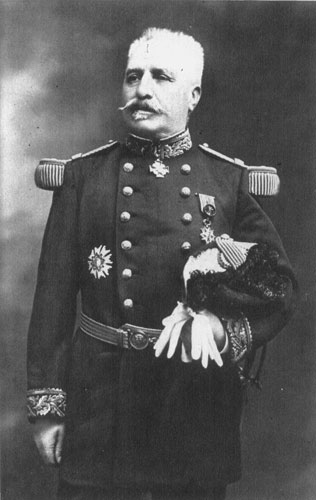
General Édouard de Curières de Castelnau, founder of the Federation

In the Federation's official bulletin, le Point de direction, Castelnau hammered home the importance of unity of all Catholics. The first national congress was held in February 1925, by which time there were more than two million members. On 10 March 1925 the cardinals and archbishops of France published a declaration attacking "the so-called laws of secularism". The church leaders told their congregations to "declare war upon laicism and its principles" until the anti-Catholic laws were repealed.

The Federation held rallies and staged demonstrations, some with up to 100,000 participants. The movement gained its first martyrs on 9 February 1925 in Marseille, when armed gangs attacked a meeting of Federation members and two were killed. The victims were given an impressive funeral, which served to demonstrate the power of the movement and discourage further attempts at intimidation.

The Cartel des Gauches was forced to reverse course in 1925, returning to the status quo in which France had an embassy in the Vatican, and Alsace-Lorraine had confessional schools, but where otherwise the church and state were rigidly separated. This compromise held until Marshal Philippe Pétain took power in 1940.

== Slow decline ==
By 1926 the Federation had 3 million members. After 1926 the struggle against laicism was replaced by more relaxed negotiations with the authorities. Although theoretically apolitical, the FNC was suspected of being right-wing in its sympathies. The church became concerned about the extremists in the Action Française (AF) movement, and on 8 March 1927 issued a decree excluding habitual readers of the Action Française paper and adherents to the movement from the sacraments and from meetings of Catholic groups such as the FNC, the Catholic Youth and the Catholic Scouts. This was unwelcome to the significant number of supporters of both the FNC and the Action Française.

The FNC did not field candidates in the 1928 elections, but advised Catholics to vote only for candidates who supported its published program. The FNC lost authority due to Pope Pius XI's desire to keep Catholic Action completely free from politics and controlled by the church. The FNC was also at odds with the church over foreign policy, in favor of Benito Mussolini in Italy and hostile to Germany, while the Vatican supported the League of Nations. To avoid confusion, the FNC was directed to rename its newspaper from Action Catholique de France to La France Catholique. As the 1930s progressed the church also began to throw its support behind the elected governments of the Third Republic, and advised the FNC to do the same rather than to promote a separate agenda.

Writing to his son on 17 June 1940, the day after Marshal Pétain had taken power, Castelnau said "I am devastated. God has given us a harsh punishment for the evils of the French Revolution. France has renounced her past; she did not want to fight." However, the FNC membership generally welcomed the accession of Marshal Pétain with his pro-Catholic policies. The FNC continued under the Vichy regime, but gradually lost influence.

== Leaders ==
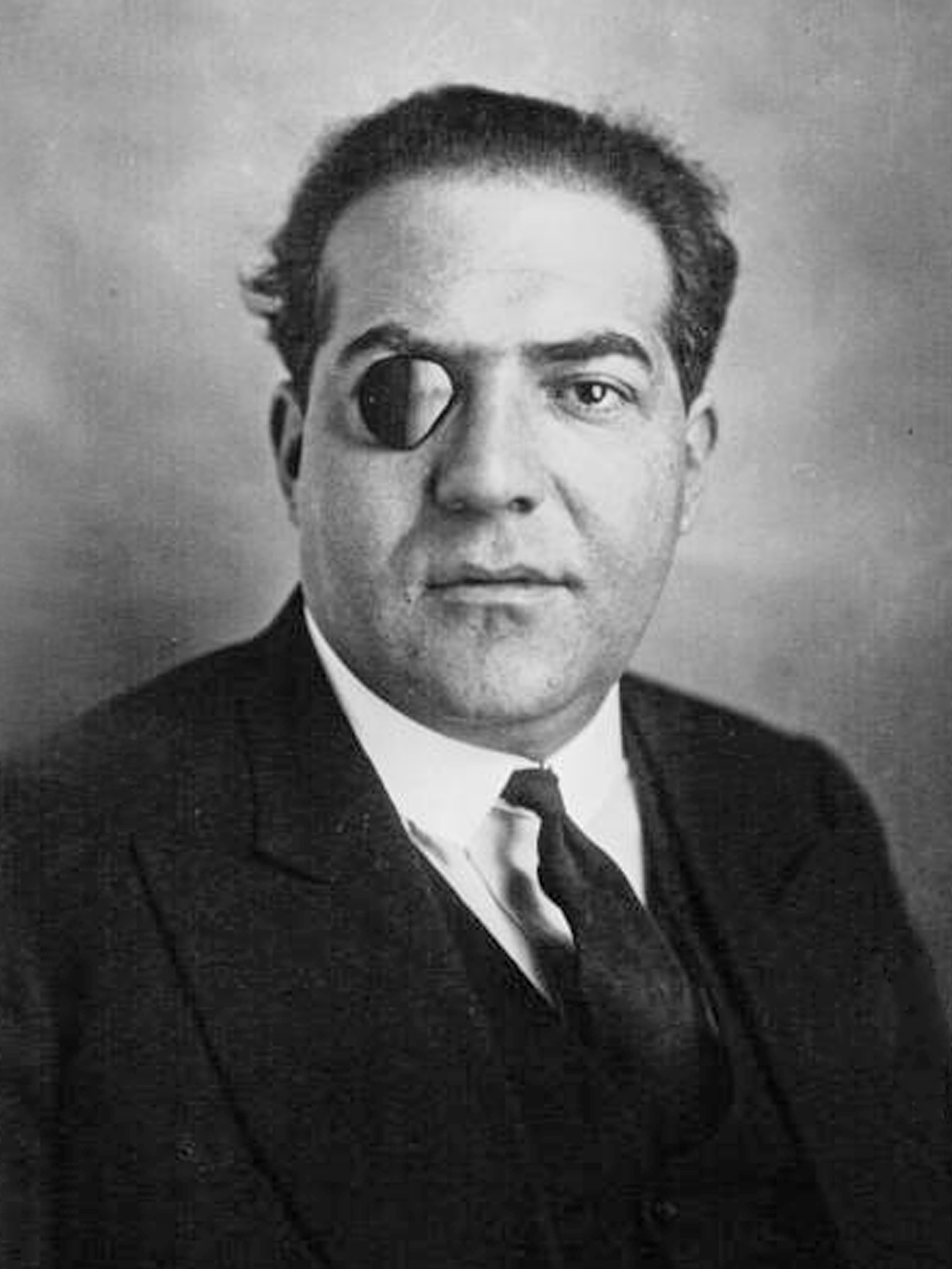
Xavier Vallat, a right-wing FNC militant later imprisoned for his persecution of Jews under Vichy

Noël-Marie-Joseph-Édouard de Curières de Castelnau was born in Languedoc in 1851, joined the army and fought in the Franco-Prussian War of 1870-1871. At the outbreak of World War I he was deputy chief of staff to the commander of the army. He held various senior commands. After the war he resigned from the army and in 1919 was elected as a Deputy representing the Catholic right. He lost his seat in 1924 and soon after founded the FNC. Castelnau was a royalist who combined extreme patriotism with extreme Catholicism. General Castelnau provided funding to other right-wing groups including Antoine Rédier's fascist Légion and Pierre Taittinger's Jeunesses Patriotes. He died on 19 March 1944.

Other leaders included Abbé Bergey, a deputy for Bordeaux and a compelling orator, and Philippe Henriot, a right-wing ant-communist and anti-republican. Henriot supported Franco in the Spanish Civil War and supported the 1940 armistice with Germany during World War II. He believed that France and Germany should unite in fighting Communism, the enemy of Christianity. Henriot became the Vichy minister of information and propaganda. He was assassinated by Resistance fighters in Paris on 28 June 1944, and was given a state funeral led by the archbishop of Paris.

The FNC militant Xavier Vallat was compelled to accept the papal ban on Action Française membership, but only reluctantly, since he thought that the Action Française and FNC were fighting the same enemy, and had many friends in the Action Française. Vallat preserved his personal contacts in the AF and remained a supporter of Charles Maurras. After World War II, both men served prison sentences for collaboration with the Germans.

The leaders of the movement were not all right wing in their views. The abbé Desgranges, an FNC leader, sympathized with the Christian Democrats. At a meeting he responded to a communist heckler by saying that the Catholic church did not support any political party, but that he was personally opposed to Fascism.
