= Noël Édouard, vicomte de Curières de Castelnau =

French general (1851–1944)

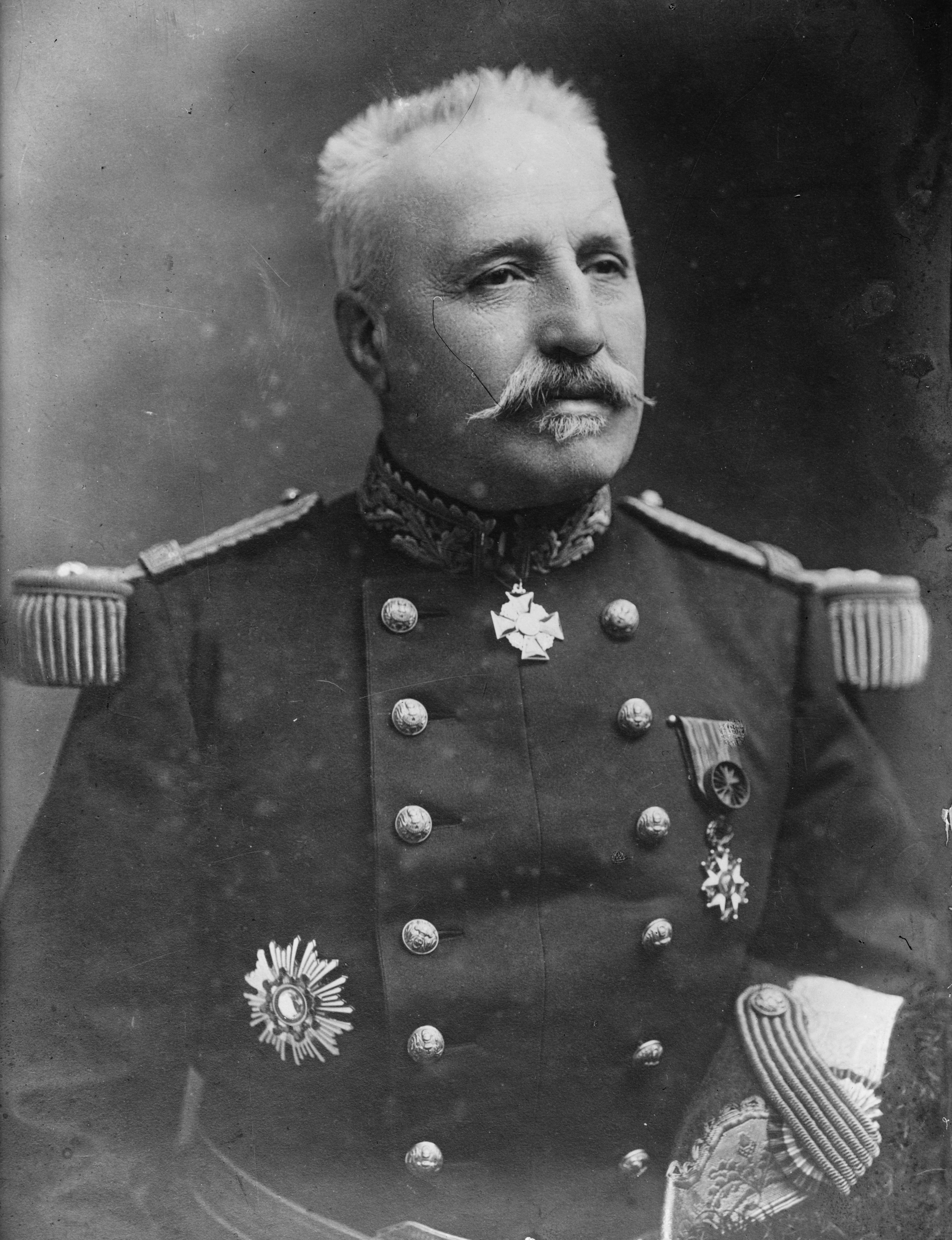
- Édouard de Castelnau in 1915
- Nickname: The Fighting Friar
- Born: 24 December 1851; Saint-Affrique, Second French Empire
- Died: 19 March 1944 (aged 92) Montastruc-la-Conseillère, German-occupied France
- Allegiance: France
- Branch: French Army
- Service years: 1870–1919
- Rank: General
- Commands: II Army; Army Group Centre; Chief of the General Staff
- Conflicts: Franco-Prussian War; First World War; Battle of the Trouée de Charmes; Battle of Grand Couronné; Battle of Verdun
- Awards: Grand-croix de la Légion d'honneur Médaille militaire Croix de guerre 1914-1918; Knight Grand Cross of the Order of the Bath; Knight Grand Cross of the Royal Victorian Order

Noël Édouard, vicomte de Curières de Castelnau (French: [kastɛlno]; 24 December 1851 – 19 March 1944) was a French military officer and Chief of Staff of the French Armed Forces during the First World War. Elected to the Chamber of Deputies in 1919 for Aveyron and president of the Army Committee in the legislature, he then took the head of a confessional political movement, the Fédération Nationale Catholique. During the Second World War, he opposed Marshal Pétain and the Vichy regime and supported the French Resistance. For a long time controversial because of a Catholicism that was considered outrageous by his opponents, historians have moderated that portrait by emphasising his great loyalty to republican institutions and disputed in particular that he could have been reactionary or antisemitic.

== Early life ==
The son of Michel de Castelnau, mayor of Saint-Affrique, Noël Édouard Marie Joseph de Curières de Castelnau was born in Saint-Affrique, into an aristocratic family of the Rouergue. He was the third of five children. His elder brother, Léonce, was a politician of national importance, the president of the parliamentary group of the Action libérale in the National Assembly. His other brother, Clément, was director of the École des mines de Saint-Étienne.

Ruined by the French Revolution, his family had to share a house in Saint-Affrique with his mother's three uncles, the Abbés Barthe. They would have liked him to be a notary, but he wanted to be a naval officer. For reasons of age, he had to reorient himself towards the Army and became part of the 54th promotion of Saint-Cyr, Promotion du Rhin (1869-1871), from which he graduated as second lieutenant on 14 August 1870. He was appointed to the 31st Infantry Regiment and took part in the Franco-Prussian War of 1870 in the Loire Army.

After the war, he served as a lieutenant and then captain in various regiments before joining the École de Guerre in 1879. Assigned to the Army Staff in Paris in 1893, he headed the 1er bureau in 1897. His career was delayed for the first time when the polemicist Urbain Gohier, in an article in L'Aurore, revealed that he was the descendant of an emigrant, who had fought in the army of the Prince of Condé during the Revolution. In 1900, he was the target of the new Minister of War, General André, who wanted to dismiss him from the army because of his aristocratic origins and his Catholicism. According to André, Castelnau did not have the republican profile that he wanted to impose on the army. The Chief of Staff, General Delanne, opposed this decision and appointed Castelnau to command the 37th Infantry Regiment in Nancy and then resigned. That led to the government being questioned in the French Chamber of Deputies and the French Senate. The minister took his revenge by keeping Castelnau in that post for five years, twice the usual length of time in that type of command. He also ensured that Castelnau was not promoted to general despite his record of service, but the affair of the files would revive his career. General André was forced to resign and a few months later, on 25 March 1906, at the request of Paul Doumer, Castelnau was promoted to General de Brigade. He successively commanded a Brigade at Sedan, then at Soissons. On 21 December 1909, he became a General de Division (equivalent to the English language rank of major general), which put him under the command of General Joseph Joffre for the first time. Joffre commanded the army corps on which the 13th Division of Chaumont depended, which Castelnau inherited. Both men got to know each other, and when Joffre was appointed head of the French Army on 2 July 1911, he insisted on having Castelnau at his side. Castelnau took the title of First Deputy Chief of Staff. His main task was to devise a new plan for mobilising and concentrating the French armies in the event of war, Plan XVII. In 1912, he was confirmed in his position as Chief of Staff and replaced General Dubail. By the decree of 30 October 1913, he was then appointed to the Conseil supérieur de la guerre and do he would take command of 2nd French Army in the event of conflict. In 1913, Castelnau found himself largely exposed to the violent debate that accompanied the Three Years' Law. Indeed, when Plan XVII was drawn up, it quickly became clear that military manpower had to be increased in peacetime. The only way to achieve that was to extend military service by an additional year, but almost two thirds of the radical and socialist deputies were fiercely opposed to the prospect of a three-year service. Led by Jean Jaurès, opposition to the bill quickly took a passionate turn. Castelnau, who was considered to have inspired the text, became the bête noire of the opponents, especially as the text was finally voted on 19 July 1913. Resentment towards Castelnau on the part of the radical-Socialist Party continued until the end of his life. Georges Clemenceau, although in favour of the law, immortalised that antagonism by giving Castelnau nicknames like the "Fighting Friar", which have become legendary.

== Great War ==
At the declaration of war, he joined his army being mobilised in Nancy. On 15 August 1914, the five French armies went on the offensive against the Germans, who were in the process of making a large overrun through Belgium. Castelnau faced the army of Prince Rupprecht of Bavaria, which was waiting for him on positions prepared in advance at Morhange. While the Grand Quartier Général (GQG) claimed that the Germans were in retreat and that there were only rearguards in front of him, Castelnau suddenly came up against considerable forces that were strongly supported by heavy artillery.

The Second French Army, composed in particular of XV, XVI and XX Corps and 2nd Reserve Division Group the last was commanded by General Léon Durand), suffered heavy losses and had to withdraw to Nancy. Fortunately, Castelnau succeeded in reforming his army, which he later launched into a flanking manoeuvre that inflicted a heavy defeat on the pursuing Germans: the Battle of the Trouée de Charmes (24-27 August) prevented the French armies retreating towards Paris from being turned to the right and made the First Battle of the Marne. Just as the other armies won the victory of the Marne, Castelnau blocked a new German offensive aimed at Nancy at the Battle of Grand Couronné (4-13 September). That earned him the nickname as the "Saviour of Nancy".

On 18 September 1914, Castelnau was promoted to Grand Officer de la Legion d'Honneur. Joffre then withdrew him from the Lorraine front and entrusted him with the mission of extending the left flank of the French armies to the north of the Oise by trying to outflank the German right wing. That was the beginning of the race to the sea, which Castelnau initiated and led to Arras. The manoeuvre was then pursued until it reached the North Sea coast by the British Expeditionary Corps, the Belgian Army and several French army corps under the command of General Foch. In Picardy, Castelnau distinguished himself by resisting a German offensive commanded by General Alexander von Kluck in the Roye region. After the war, that earned him this appreciation from his former adversary: "The French adversary towards whom our sympathies instinctively went, because of his great military talent and his chivalry, is General de Castelnau. And I would like him to know that".'

From November 1914 onwards, the fighting in Belgium and France took the form of trench warfare. Implementing new tactical principles, notably by launching his infantry under the protection of a rolling artillery barrage, Castelnau won a victory at Le Quesnoy-en Santerre. From early 1915, he advocated adopting a defensive attitude on the French front until he had enough heavy artillery to break through the German defences and, in the meantime, to launch a major offensive in the Balkans. His idea was supported by President Raymond Poincaré and Foreign Minister Aristide Briand but opposed by Joffre and the GQG.

In June 1915, he was placed at the head of the Centre Army Group (GAC) and led the Champagne Offensive of 25 September 1915. In a few days, he took 25,000 prisoners and 125 guns, but disrupted by continuous rain, the offensive did not lead to a strategic victory. After that feat of arms, he was made a Grand Croix de la Legion d'Honneur on 8 October 1915 and, two months later, on 11 December 1915, he was appointed Chief of the General Staff of the French Armies, a position that he held throughout 1916. In that position, he assisted Generalissimo Joffre. He made a decisive contribution to the Battle of Verdun. Contrary to the majority of officers in the GQG, who did not believe in a German offensive there, he feared one and intervened to reinforce the town's defences and had XX Army Corps in Bar-le-Duc put on alert so that it could be used as reinforcements in the event of a German attack, which began on 21 February 1916. After three days of fighting, the French defences were in the process of giving way, and Castelnau went to Verdun and took the crucial decisions that would allow the resistance to take hold. He appointed General Philippe Pétain and reorganised the local command. Throughout the nine months of the battle, he intervened during the most critical episodes. After six weeks of fighting, he decided to appoint General Robert Nivelle, with Pétain taking command of the Centre Army Group (GAC). In November 1916, against the advice of the officers around Joffre, he ordered the last offensive and turning the long battle into a French victory.

Due to his position as Chief of Staff Castelnau played a leading role in the design of the Battle of the Somme. He supervised the plans prepared by the French GHQ for this battle and he took part in the preparatory meetings held with Joffre, Haig and Robertson. In theory, he should have been involved as well in the decisions to be made on a tactical level itself as he did at Verdun. However, Joffre had in fact excluded him from the conduct of this battle. As the British ambassador to France, Lord Bertie, noted, Joffre feared that the government would replace him with Castelnau as Generalissimo. He therefore avoided as far as possible offering him the opportunity to showcase his skills, as had been the case at Verdun. This sidelining was to have the most serious consequences. At the inception of the battle, while on the right bank of the Somme, the British were facing important difficulties, the French were very successful on the left bank. Over an area measuring more than 10 kilometres, they had captured all the German lines of defence. German troops had disappeared, leaving behind dozens of guns, including all their heavy ones. Immediately, Castelnau indicated that it was necessary to exploit this breakthrough and to attack toward the south. Few weeks ago, he had forecasted this scenario and prepared the corresponding instructions. But it would take Joffre almost one week to have them executed. His hesitations, which are still not explained today, gave the Germans an unexpected delay which they took advantage of to bring in reinforcements and dig trenches. When Joffre finally confirmed the attack orders prepared by Castelnau, it was a failure. This mistake deprived the Allies of a great victory that could have allowed them to shorten this war. Joffre and the French generals were careful not to mention it in their memoirs and blamed it on the British military leaders.

In December 1916, Joffre was replaced as commander-in-chief of the armies. Nivelle was chosen to succeed him, with Joffre being elevated to the dignity of Marshal of France. The post of Chief of Staff of the Armies was abolished, and Castelnau was appointed to command the Eastern Army Group. However, that sector of the front, where his units operated, was the least active. On 25 June 1917, he received the military medal. In the spring of 1918, taking advantage of the Russian withdrawal from the conflict after the Bolshevik Revolution, the Germans brought all their forces back to France and Belgium and then launched a series of major offensives that were on the way to making them victorious. The armies under Castelnau's command did not play a leading role during that period. On the other hand, as the Franco-British troops, reinforced by the American contingent, regained the initiative during the summer, he was appointed to prepare a decisive manoeuvre in Lorraine. In that sector, the weakness of the German position suggested a major success that could hasten the end of the war. Castelnau did not experience a new victory until two days later. The Armistice of 11 November 1918 suspended his attack, which would probably have taken him deep into Germany. Despite the additional losses that would have caused ("I know only too well the bitterness of the tears shed on the graves", he wrote to his family and thought of his three sons, Gerald, Xavier and Hugues, who had been killed in the war), Castelnau believed that the Allies should not have signed the armistice prematurely.

== After the Great War ==
He made a solemn entry into Colmar on 22 November 1918 during the celebrations for the town's liberation. On that occasion, the press around the world announced his elevation to the dignity of a marshal, but the government refused. However, public opinion demanded it, as was shown by the ovation that he received on 14 July 1919 when he marched on the Champs Élysées. As he passed, the crowd began to chant, "Maréchal! Maréchal!" It demanded for him to be elevated to the marshalate as Joffre, Foch and Pétain had been. Like the other great military leaders of the Great War, he was the object of many honours. In the city of Lyon, Mayor Édouard Herriot, although very anticlerical, welcomed him with a speech of rare emphasis and stated, "Your victory, your unique victory at the Grand Couronne will become classic like that of Thermopylae in the past. I compare you to that great leader, Turenne, whose figure shines in our History as one of the noblest, simplest and purest of our race and our time".'

Castelnau entered Parliament in November 1919 as a deputy for Aveyron, within the majority right-wing Republican Federation (that Assembly was known as the Horizon Blue Chamber as so many deputies were military veterans). He was elected President of the Army Committee. In that capacity, he left his mark on the legislature by having an 18-month term of military service adopted on 23 April 1923. It was undoubtedly his active participation in political life that prompted the government of Aristide Briand and War Minister Louis Barthou to remove him from the new list of Marshals announced on 19 February 1921. Indeed, in the eyes of many parliamentarians, including Léon Blum, Castelnau was becoming more and more of a national leader. The blocking of Castelnau's promotion triggered a questioning of the government in the National Assembly. Despite a strong movement of public opinion, as shown by the poll carried out by the daily newspaper Le Journal in favour of his nomination, Castelnau was never made Marshal. Clemenceau himself was surprised: "I would have been neither surprised nor upset to see the name of General de Castelnau among the six Marshals of France. It is regrettable that he has been forgotten and it is to us and not to him that this oversight does the greatest harm"'.

In the 1924 elections, which saw the victory of the Cartel des gauches, he was defeated by the mathematician Émile Borel. Castelnau then wanted to withdraw from public life. However, faced with the resurgence of an anticlerical policy implemented by the new President of the Council (Prime Minister), Édouard Herriot, he launched the idea of a vast national federation of various Catholic movements. The Fédération Nationale Catholique (FNC) was born. It had up to two million members. At its head, he forced the government to abandon its entire anticlerical programme in the face of the large demonstrations that Castelnau organised throughout France. That earned him the detestation of part of the Radical Socialist Party and made him be caricatured as a reactionary and royalist character. His detractors went so far as to accuse him of being anti-Dreyfus although he never spoke publicly or privately about Dreyfus. As for the accusation of anti-Semitism, it is all the more unfounded, as Castelnau was one of the right-wing men who was most respected by the French Jewish community. As well, Castelnau never expressed any preference in terms of political regime. As a deputy, he belonged to not a royalist party but a Republican one. It was not until the early 21st century that contemporary historians such as René Rémond have corrected that image and described him as a moderate right-wing Republican with social ideas ahead of his time.

== Second World War ==
In June 1940, as soon as the Armistice was announced, he distanced himself from all those who rallied to the Vichy regime. He resigned from his position as president of the FNC and was very critical of the Catholic hierarchy, which he thought was too close to Pétain. All of his private correspondence from the period has survived, which makes it possible to follow and to date his thoughts with precision. He encouraged his two grandsons of fighting age, Urbain de la Croix and Gérald de Castelnau, to join the Free French. The former was killed on 31 March 1945 when he was crossing the Rhine, and the latter was seriously wounded on 16 October 1944 during the French Campaign. Although very old, he actively supported the French Resistance and did not hesitate to hide weapons for Colonel Pélissier's Secret Army (AS).

He died at the Château de Lasserre, in Montastruc-la-Conseillère, on 18 March 1944 and was buried on 21 March in the family vault in Montastruc. During the burial ceremony, the Bishop of Toulouse, Jules-Géraud Saliège, although very handicapped, had himself carried into the church to honour the memory of Castelnau to whom he was very close. These were his last words at the end of the ceremony: "General de Castelnau was for us a support, a pride, a flag".

== Legacy ==
Like all the great military leaders of the Great War, Castelnau has had his supporters and detractors. The judgement of current historians who describe him as one of the most brilliant and accomplished, if not the most accomplished, general officers of his generation is the same as that of many of his peers. General Maurice Pellé, Major General at the GQG, wrote in July 1915, "General de Castelnau has seen a lot in his career and worked a lot; he knows war. He sees quickly and accurately. His battle preparations are admirable: they are thorough in their detail and leave as little as possible to chance".

The opinion of Alfred Milner, 1st Viscount Milner, a member of the Cabinet, is interesting. Comparing Castelnau to the other great French and British military leaders, he said, "Marshal Haig saw nothing, prepared nothing, General Pétain was only concerned with preserving the situation, while General Foch is a sick man, an impulsive man who treats the Divisions like a football ball. The only general to emerge was General de Castelnau, who told me what the Germans were going to do, where they would attack, what parade to take, and all this three months before it happened and that it was happening point by point".' Field Marshal Haig was very admiring of Castelnau's victory at the Battle of the Trouée de Charmes, which he described as an "enormous victory" In his memoirs, Major-General James Harbord of the American Expeditionary Force stated, "It was General de Castelnau, whom many considered the best French general, but a royalist and a Catholic, and therefore suspect. The Americans were very fond of Castelnau, partly because of his aversion to long speeches. Good old Castelnau limited his remarks to raising his glass and wishing that we could soon water our horses together in the Rhine".'

== Quotes ==
Many of the quotes attributed to Castelnau are apocryphal. On the other hand, there some are attested to by irrefutable documents. For example, Castelnau was quoted as saying "Forward, everywhere, all the way" on 25 August 1914 at the Battle of the Charmes. Colonel Charles à Court Repington, a war correspondent, reported in The Times after his visit to Verdun the words of General de Castelnau: "Rather than submit to German slavery, the whole French race will perish on the battlefield". In his tribute to the army for the newspaper L'Écho de Paris on 14 July 1919, Castelnau wrote, "The French infantry triumphed over this infernal outburst of fury and horror that surpassed anything the human imagination could ever conceive".

Here is his opinion on Pétain and Vichy during the summer of 1940: "More than ever, the armistice seems to me to be ignominious; I can only explain this act by the profound intellectual and moral failure of Pétain, Weygand and Co. In him, senile pride when 'he gives his person to France', defeatism, intellectual weakness compete with cowardice [...] The Marshal's government is awful in its mentality. The path it leads us down will be that of catastrophe".

In 1942, to a priest who had come to bring him a message from Cardinal Pierre-Marie Gerlier asking him to moderate his criticism of the Marshal, Castelnau replied, "So your cardinal has a tongue? I thought he had worn it out licking Pétain's arse".

== Military career ==
- 25/03/1906 : Brigadier
- 21/12/1909 : Major General
- 12/07/1912 : Lieutenant General
- 19/12/1916 : General
- 1921 General retained in activity without limit of time.

== Honours ==
Légion d'honneur : chevalier (29/12/1891), officier (12/09/1899), commandeur (30/12/1911), grand-officier (18/09/1914), grand-croix (08/10/1915);

Médaille militaire (25/06/17);

Médaille commémorative de la guerre 1870-1871;

Croix de Guerre 1914-1918;

Médaille interalliée 1914-1918;

Médaille commémorative de la Grande Guerre;

Knight Grand Cross of the Order of the Bath (GCB);

Knight Grand Cross of the Royal Victorian Order (GCVO)

War Order of Virtuti Militari Pologne);

Grand Cross Imperial Order of Saint Alexander Nevsky ( Russia);

Great Cross of Order of the White Eagle ( Russia);

Grand Cross of Order of Saint Stanislaus ( Russia);

Grand Cross of Order of Saint Anna ( Russia);

Croix de guerre (Belgium);

Distinguished Service Medal (U.S. Army)

Grand Cross Order of St. Gregory the Great Vatican);

Knight Grand Cross of the Order of Saints Maurice and Lazarus

== Remembrance ==
Rue De Castelnau and De Castelnau metro station in Montreal are named after the general.

School year n° 198 of the École spéciale militaire de Saint-Cyr (2011–2014) was called Castelnau's school year in honour of the general.
