= Daniel Bergey =

French priest and politician (1881–1950)

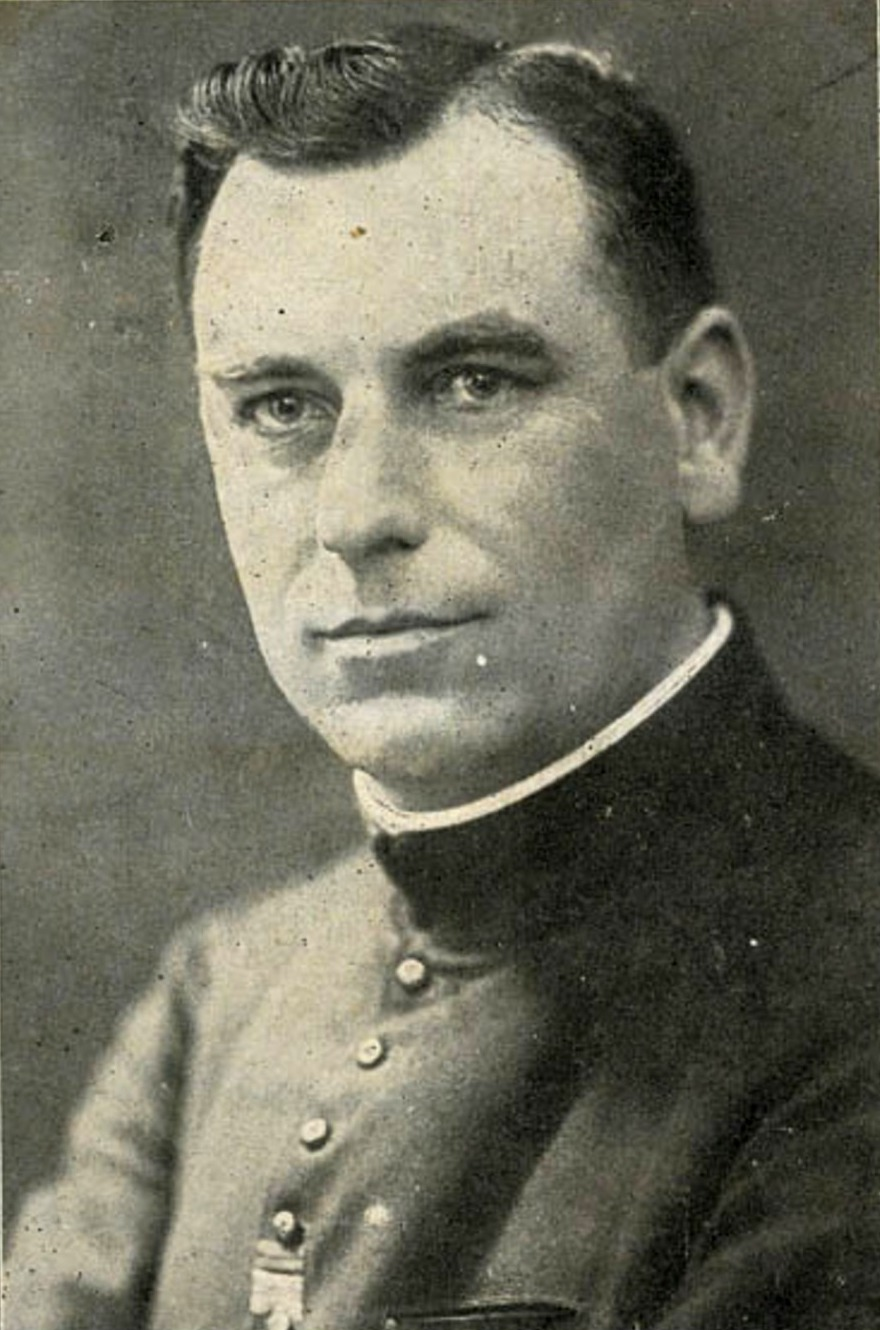

Member of Parliament for Gironde
- In office 22 April 1928 – 31 May 1932 (4 years, 1 month and 9 days)
- In office 11 May 1924 – 31 May 1928 (4 years and 20 days)

Personal details
- Born: 19 April 1881 Lesparre-Médoc
- Died: 31 December 1950 (aged 69) Saint-Émilion
- Party: Popular Republican Union of Gironde
- Profession: Priest

Daniel Bergey (19 April 1881 – 31 December 1950) was a French Catholic priest and politician. He was the president of the Popular Republican Union of Gironde between 1925 and 1932.

== Biography ==
Daniel Vivien Michel Bergey was born on 19 April 1881 in the village of Saint-Trélody-près-Lesparre (now Lesparre-Médoc), Gironde, in a poor family of small farmers. He was ordained a priest in 1904, and was from 1906 de facto vicar of Saint-Émilion after his uncle—who had occupied the position until then—became paralyzed. In 1924, he founded the League of Priests Veterans (PAC; Ligue des Prêtres Anciens Combattants). Bergey was a member of Parliament for the department of Gironde between 1924 and 1932.

He died on 31 December 1950 in Saint-Émilion at 69.

== Bibliography ==
- H. Hilaire Darrigrand, L'abbé Bergey, héros des champs de bataille, tribun populaire, législateur clairvoyant, Éditions du Vieux Colombier, 1956
- B. Bordachar, Un Grand orateur, l'abbé Bergey : Député de la Gironde, 1881-1950, Grasset, 1963
