= Saint-Martin-de-Bréthencourt =

- Commune
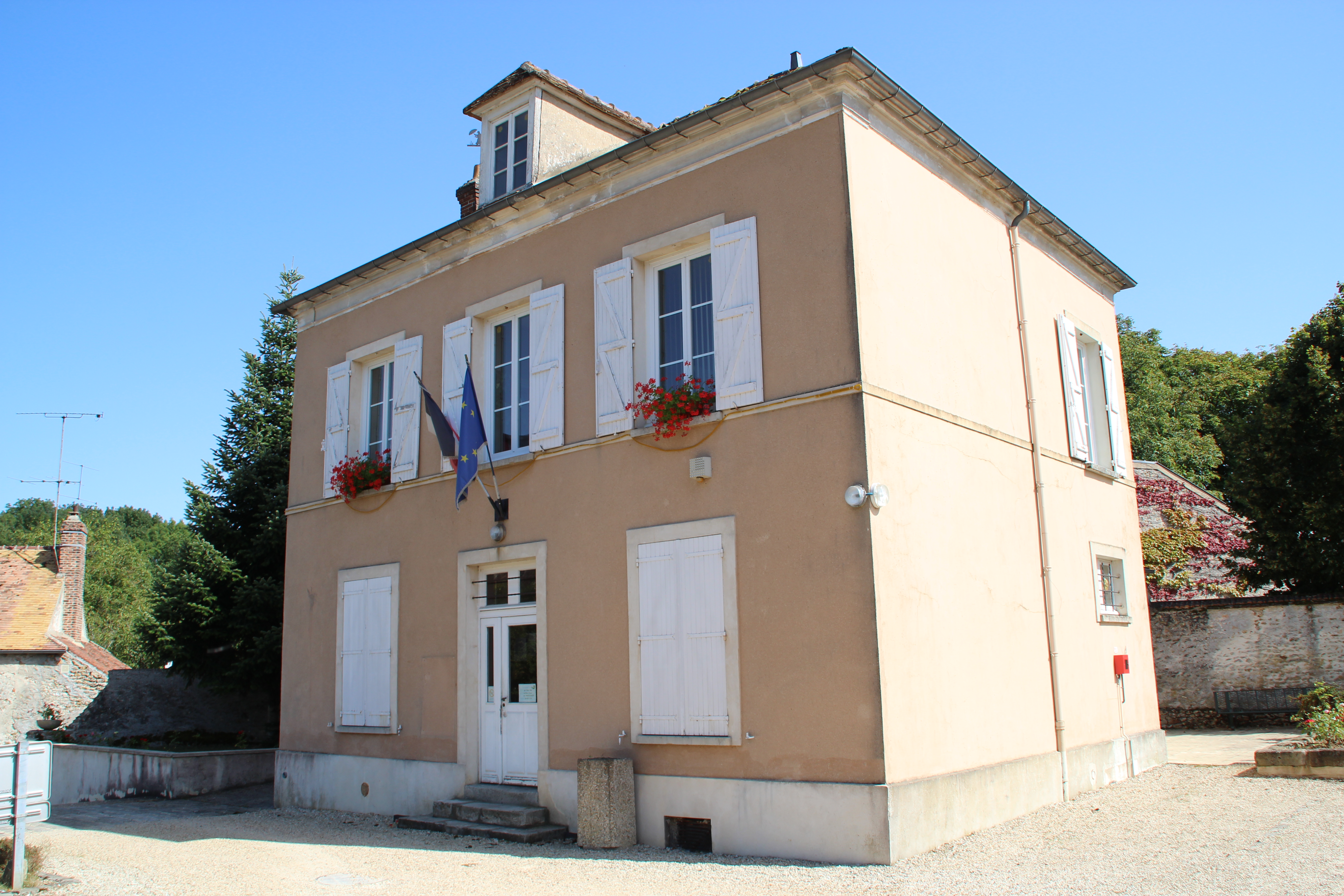
- Town hall
- Location of Saint-Martin-de-Bréthencourt
- Location within France Location within Île-de-France (region)
- Coordinates: 48°30′37″N 1°55′42″E
- Country: France
- Region: Île-de-France
- Department: Yvelines
- Arrondissement: Rambouillet
- Canton: Rambouillet
- Intercommunality: CA Rambouillet Territoires

Government
  - Mayor (2020–2026): Jacky Drappier
- Area^{1}: 16.67 km^{2} (6.44 sq mi)
- Elevation: 140 m (460 ft)
- Highest elevation: 162 m (531 ft)
- Lowest elevation: 107 m (351 ft)
- Population (2023): 690
  - Density: 41/km^{2} (110/sq mi)
- Time zone: UTC+01:00 (CET)
  - Summer (DST): UTC+02:00 (CEST)
- INSEE/Postal code: 78564 /78660
- ^{1} French Land Register data, which excludes lakes, ponds, glaciers > 1 km^{2} (0.386 sq mi or 247 acres) and river estuaries.

Saint-Martin-de-Bréthencourt (French pronunciation: [sɛ̃ maʁtɛ̃ də bʁetɑ̃kuʁ]) is a commune in the Yvelines department in the Île-de-France in north-central France.

== See also ==
- Communes of the Yvelines department
