= Church of Saint Mary of the Latins =

Church building in Jerusalem

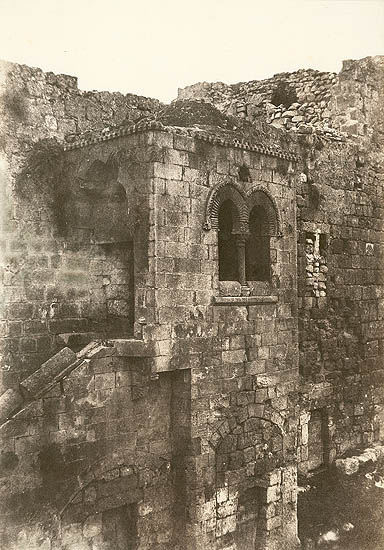
A. Salzmann - "Arab staircase" of Sainte-Marie la Grande, Jerusalem

The church of Saint Mary of the Latins (Latin: Sancta Maria Latina) was a church building in the Old City of Jerusalem in the Crusader Kingdom of Jerusalem.

== History ==
In around the middle of the 11th century, Amalfitan traders obtained permission from the Caliph to build the church of Sainte Marie-Latine next to the Church of the Resurrection in Jerusalem, as well as a hospice for the accommodation of Christian pilgrims to the Holy Land. The hospice-hospital was run by Benedictine monks.

Prior to the First Crusade (1096–1099) and the capture of Jerusalem in 1099 by the Latins, this first Frankish hospice-hospital only functioned as such. It was later considered a Hospitaller church, but initially had no connection to any military order, and the Knights Hospitaller was only founded in the following century. In the 12th century, Crusader historian William of Tyre writes about the existence of a monastery, belonging to the people of Amalfi, which took charge of the hospital and its chapel. The latter had been dedicated to the patriarch of Alexandria, John the Almoner (610–616).

The "great" church was allegedly sacked by Saladin after the fall of Jerusalem.

== Location and identification ==
Confusingly, there were two Crusader-era Churches of St Mary in close proximity to each other in the Hospitallers' Quarter. Medieval sources are using three different names when they are addressing the two churches: St Mary of the Latins, St Mary Minor (dedicated c. 1060), and St Mary Major (dedicated 1080). Various researchers have identified them differently, but Conrad Schick and most modern researchers see St Mary of the Latins as being one and the same as St Mary Minor, its ruins now built over by the German Protestant Church of the Redeemer. The remains of St Mary Major have completely disappeared under the 1901 Greek Aftimos Market.

== See also ==
- Muristan, the Jerusalem quarter where the church and the Hospitaller HQ stood
- Church of Saint Mary of the Germans, another Church of Saint Mary from Crusader Jerusalem
