= Balian Grenier =

Crusader and count of Sidon

- Predecessor: Renaud Grenier
- Successor: Julian Grenier

Count of Sidon
- Reign: 1202–1241
- Successor: Julian Grenier
- Born: 1190s
- Died: 1241
- Spouse: Ida de Reynel
- Issue: Julian Grenier
- House: House of Grenier
- Father: Renaud Grenier
- Mother: Helvis of Ibelin
- Religion: Roman Catholicism

Balian I Grenier was the count of Sidon and one of the most important lords of the Kingdom of Jerusalem from 1202 to 1241. He succeeded his father Renaud. His mother was Helvis, a daughter of Balian of Ibelin. He was a powerful and important representative of the native aristocracy during the three Levantine crusades of the first half of the thirteenth century.

During the Fifth Crusade, Balian advised the troops of Andrew II of Hungary against sallying into the deserted regions of his county of Sidon, regions almost under Saracen control. The Hungarians refused to listen, however, and many were massacred during a Turcoman ambush.

During the Sixth Crusade, Balian supported Holy Roman Emperor Frederick II for the throne of Jerusalem. He negotiated with Giordano Filangieri, brother of Richard Filangieri, sent by Frederick in 1228 to represent his authority in Acre until the emperor could make the trip in person. Balian was the chief native ally of the crusaders at the time when they were not well received by the locals. He supported the Emperor and his Germanisation, but tried, as with the previous crusade, to prevent a bloodbath. In 1229, Frederick left Balian in charge of Tyre and in 1231 he gave him the co-regency (bailiwick) of the kingdom with Garnier l'Aleman.

During Barons' Crusade of Theobald I of Navarre in 1239, Balian joined a group of defiant barons at least part of the way to Gaza where a battle was fought between crusader and Egyptian forces. Balian was probably part of a group led by Hugh of Burgundy which departed before the actual battle. The remaining group of the crusaders charged the Egyptians, was routed, resulting in the capture of Amaury VI of Montfort and the death of Henry II of Bar. If Balian was part of the group which stayed and fought, he would have been among the relatively small number of survivors not to be captured by the Muslims.

Balian later received the castle of Shaqil Arnun, which his father had defended by a ruse from Saladin in 1190, from the sultan As-Salih Ayyub. He died in 1240 or, according to Philip of Novara, 1241.

He was betrothed to Marguerite of Brienne (seduced by Frederick II), daughter of Walter III, Count of Brienne, older brother of John of Brienne), ultimately marrying Ida de Reynel. His son Julian succeeded him in Sidon, the greater part of which had been recovered by Balian.

== Sources ==
- Setton, Kenneth M. (general editor) A History of the Crusades: Volume II — The Later Crusades, 1189 – 1311. Robert Lee Wolff and Harry W. Hazard, editors. University of Wisconsin Press: Milwaukee, 1969.
