= Treaty of Jaffa (1192) =

Truce ending the Third Crusade

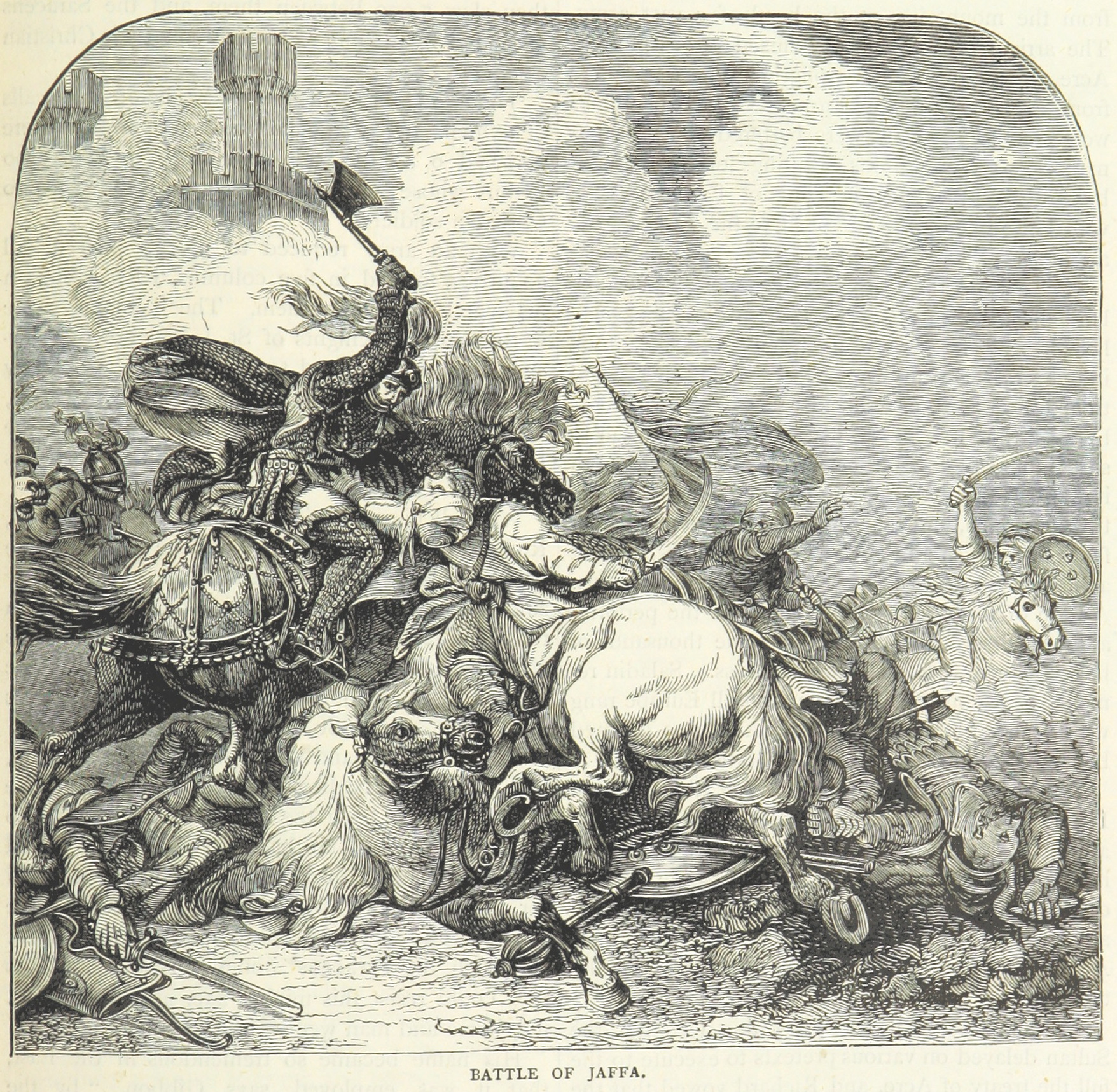
Richard I of England at the Battle of Jaffa

The Treaty of Jaffa, less commonly referred to as the Treaty of Ramla or the treaty of 1192, was a truce agreed to during the Crusades. It was signed on 1 or 2 September 1192 A.D. (20th of Sha'ban 588 AH) between Saladin, Sultan of Egypt and Richard the Lionheart, King of England, shortly after the July–August 1192 Battle of Jaffa. The treaty, negotiated with the help of Balian of Ibelin, guaranteed a three-year truce between the two armies. This treaty ended the Third Crusade.

== Provisions ==
The treaty mainly addressed two main issues: the status of Jerusalem and pilgrimage rights for Christians, and the extent of sovereignty of the Kingdom of Jerusalem in the Holy Land. In the first regard, the treaty guaranteed safe passage of Christians and Muslims through Palestine, stating that Jerusalem would remain under Islamic control, while it would be open to Christian pilgrimages. In the second issue, it stated that the Christians would hold the coast from Tyre to Jaffa, The Kingdom of Jerusalem, which had lost almost all of its territory following the Battle of Hattin in 1187, was restored as essentially a coastal strip that extended between these two cities. Ascalon's fortifications were to be demolished and the town returned to Saladin.

Neither Saladin nor King Richard were fond of the overall accord, but had little other choice. Saladin had been weakened by the trials and expense of war, while Richard had insufficient men and provisions to conquer Jerusalem. Each had to deal with threats to his kingdom at home. Richard left Acre on 9 October 1192.

== Later treaties ==
In 1229 a somewhat similar double treaty was signed, one in Tell el-Ajjul and one in Jaffa, which together brought an end to the Sixth Crusade. The treaties of Tell Ajjul and Jaffa settled the territorial disputes between the competing Ayyubid rulers of Egypt, Syria and various smaller principalities, allowing Sultan al-Kamil of Egypt to close a diplomatic deal with the leader of the Sixth Crusade, Emperor Frederick II.

== See also ==
- List of treaties

== Bibliography ==
- Richard, Jean (1999). The Crusades, p. 328. ISBN 978-0521625661
- Tyerman, Christopher. The Crusades. pp. 461, 471
- Riley-Smith, Jonathan. The Crusades, p. 146
- Axelrod, Alan and Charles L. Phillips, editors. "Encyclopedia of Historical Treaties and Alliances, Vol. 1". Zenda Inc., New York, 2001. ISBN 0816030901.
