= Berard of Castagna =

Berard's signature, from a document of 1242

Berard of Castagna (c. 1172 – 8 September 1252) was a prelate and diplomat of the Kingdom of Sicily, who served as the archbishop of Bari (1207–1213) and archbishop of Palermo (1213–1252). Throughout his career he was a close ally of King Frederick II, who was also Holy Roman Emperor after 1220. He played a prominent role in the Sixth Crusade, both in the diplomatic preliminaries and in Frederick's visit to Jerusalem.

== Origins and early life ==
Berard was born between about 1167 and 1177. His family and name came from Castagna in the Abruzzo. Contemporary documents give his surname as de Castanea, but a 14th-century copy of the Breve chronicon de rebus Siculis calls him de Castaca and, until the 1970s, this was the name by which he was known to scholarship. It was a minor noble family in the orbit of the counts of Manoppello. It had branched out from the Abruzzo and had possessions in the Basilicata and Terra d'Otranto.

In 1198, Berard was in the following of Counts Gentile and Manerio of Manoppello when they founded a hospital at Roccamontepiano. In 1200, he worked for their brother, Walter of Palearia, bishop of Troia, as procurator of church lands. He may have been a clergyman already by that time.

== Archbishop of Bari ==
Berard succeeded Doferius as archbishop of Bari in the latter half of 1207 and was consecrated by the papal legate Gregorio de Galgano. His first two years in Bari are obscure. No document records his activities prior to July 1209. That month, Frederick II granted the archdiocese two plots for building and the casalis of Laterza. In September 1209, the lord of Bitritto, in the presence of the papal legate, handed over the castle of Bitritto to the archbishop. This grant was confirmed by Frederick II in July 1210.

In the fall of 1212, Berard accompanied Frederick to Germany as papal legate during the dispute over the German throne. On 10 September 1213, Pope Innocent III transferred him to the vacant see of Palermo, which, since it was the capital of the kingdom, was effectively a promotion.

== Archbishop of Palermo ==
Berard attended the Fourth Lateran Council in 1215, where, at the second session on 20 November, he read aloud a letter from Frederick requesting recognition of his 1212 election as "King of the Romans" (emperor-elect). In 1217, he accepted the Dominican Order into his diocese.

Berard played an important role in the negotiations that preceded the Sixth Crusade. He accompanied Fakhr al-Dīn, the ambassador of Sultan al-Kāmil of Egypt, on his return journey, arriving in Egypt in September or October 1227. From Alexandria, he was escorted to Cairo for a meeting with the sultan. There he was joined Frederick's other ambassador, Thomas of Aquino, who had been sent ahead in July or August. The envoys sought the return of the city of Jerusalem to the kingdom of Jerusalem in exchange for Frederick's military assistance against the sultan's brother, al-Muʿaẓẓam of Damascus. They subsequently travelled to Damascus for a meeting with al-Muʿaẓẓam. According to the Arab chronicles, al-Muʿaẓẓam told them, "Tell your lord. I am not like others. I have nothing to give him but a sword." Berard returned to Sicily with gifts from al-Kāmil, including an elephant, in January 1228.

Berard embarked with Frederick on the Sixth Crusade at Brindisi in June 1229, in spite of the emperor's excommunication. After the Treaty of Jaffa, he followed Frederick to Jerusalem and assisted at his coronation in the Church of the Holy Sepulchre. He was present with Frederick when the Treaty of San Germano ending the War of the Keys was publicly confirmed on 23 July 1230, paving the way for Frederick's absolution.

In 1235, Berard accompanied Frederick from Palermo to Fano before going on to Perugia to confer with Pope Gregory IX while the emperor returned to Germany. At Fano in April, Berard was appointed to the Sicilian regency council along with Thomas of Aquino, James of Capua, Peter of Ravello and Henry of Morra. In December 1238, Berard escorted the Empress Isabella of England to Lombardy and in February 1240 he escorted her back to Sicily. Frederick's dispute with the papacy was ongoing. In 1238, Berard twice visited Gregory IX, once at Anagni and once at Rome, in an effort to maintain the peace. He failed and Gregory excommunicated Frederick on 20 March 1239.

After the election of Pope Innocent IV, Frederick sent Berard, Pier delle Vigne and Taddeo di Sessa to Anagni to seek the emperor's absolution, but they were excommunicated themselves. Through the intervention of Pietro da Collemezzo, the archbishop of Rouen, they were granted absolution on 2 September 1243, although Berard's was somewhat delayed on account of his greater culpability as an archbishop.

Berard was Frederick's representative at the First Council of Lyon in 1245. He was unable to persuade the assembled prelates of the emperor's orthodoxy. In 1246, he led a delegation to Innocent IV claiming that he had submitted the emperor to an interrogation and was willing to swear an oath to his orthodoxy. This was rejected. Despite the emperor's excommunication and deposition, Berard returned to the imperial camp, where he was present during the siege of Parma. In gratitude for his services, Frederick granted the church of Palermo further privileges.

Berard was a witness to Frederick's last will, drawn up at Fiorentino in 1250. He was present at Frederick's deathbed and absolved him before his death on 13 December. He brought his body back to Palermo for burial in the cathedral. On 27 January 1251, Innocent IV reprimanded Berard and ordered him to cooperate with the papal legate being sent to Sicily.

Berard did not respond to the papal letter and the legate, Marino Filangieri, died in July. A document from August shows that Berard was still regarded as a familiaris—a member of the royal household—of Frederick's successor, Conrad IV. He died on 8 September 1252 at Palermo. More a politician than a pastor, his episcopate was characterized by an extreme closeness to Frederick and unwavering loyalty in the face of papal opposition.

== Bibliography ==
- Abulafia, David (1988). Frederick II: A Medieval Emperor. Allen Lane.
- Kamp, Norbert [in German] (1975a). Kirche und Monarchie im staufischen Königreich Sizilien, 1: Prosopographische Grundlegung: Bistümer und Bischöfe des Königreichs 1194–1266, 2: Apulien. Wilhelm Fink.
- Kamp, Norbert (1975b). Kirche und Monarchie im staufischen Königreich Sizilien, 1: Prosopographische Grundlegung: Bistümer und Bischöfe des Königreichs 1194–1266, 3: Sizilien. Wilhelm Fink.
- Kamp, Norbert (2002). "The Bishops of Southern Italy in the Norman and Staufen Periods". In G. A. Loud; A. Metcalfe (eds.). The Society of Norman Italy. Brill. pp. 185–209.
- Matthew, Donald (1992). The Norman Kingdom of Sicily. Cambridge University Press.
- Pispiso, Enrico (2005). "Berardo di Castagna (di Castacca)". Federiciana: Enciclopedia fridericiana. Istituto dell'Enciclopedia Italiana.
- Pixton, Paul B. (1995). The German Episcopacy and the Implementation of the Decrees of the Fourth Lateran Council, 1216–1245: Watchmen on the Tower. E. J. Brill. ISBN 9789004102620.
- Pratesi, Alessandro [in Italian] (1966). "Berardo de Castacca". Dizionario Biografico degli Italiani (in Italian). Vol. 8: Bellucci–Beregan. Rome: Institute of the Italian Encyclopaedia. ISBN 978-88-12-00032-6.
- Takayama, Hiroshi (2010). "Frederick II's Crusade: An Example of Christian–Muslim Diplomacy". Mediterranean Historical Review. 25 (2): 169–185. doi:10.1080/09518967.2010.540419. S2CID 162571360.
- Van Cleve, Thomas C. [in French] (1972). The Emperor Frederick II of Hohenstaufen: Immutator Mundi. Clarendon Press.
- Whalen, Brett Edward (2019). The Two Powers: The Papacy, the Empire, and the Struggle for Sovereignty in the Thirteenth Century. University of Pennsylvania Press.
