= Robert of Nantes =

Mid 13th-century Latin patriarch of Jerusalem

Robert of Nantes (died 8 June 1254) was the Latin patriarch of Jerusalem from 1240 to 1254.

== Early life ==
Robert was a native of the Saintonge. The only certain evidence of this is a letter from Pope Alexander IV in 1255, after Robert's death, addressed to Robert's nephew Peter Vigerii, who was a priest in the diocese of Saintes at the time. Peter had a brother named Hugh, who attended the University of Bologna in the 1260s, along with a fellow student named Geoffrey of Archiac; Peter was also the archpriest of the parish of Archiac, and all three of Peter, Hugh, and Geoffrey eventually became bishops of Saintes. Peter and Hugh's father was also named Hugh, but Robert's exact relationship to them is not known, nor are the specific place or date of his birth.

== In Italy ==
According to Alberic of Trois-Fontaines, Robert was a bishop in "Apulia" and was expelled from his see by the Holy Roman Emperor Frederick II. It is possible, but also not certain, that Robert was the otherwise unnamed bishop of Aquino who participated in the War of the Keys with Pope Gregory IX against Frederick in 1229-1230, while Frederick was away on crusade. When Frederick returned to Italy, the bishop of Aquino was temporarily exiled to Monte Cassino, before being allowed to return after the Treaty of San Germano. How Robert came to Italy from the Saintonge is also not known, but it is possible that, like his nephew Hugh, he studied or taught at the University of Bologna, and was recruited by Pope Gregory in the 1220s, when Gregory was still cardinal Ugolino and was the papal legate in northern Italy. If so, then Robert may have been the bishop of Aquino from 1225 to around 1235.

== Bishop of Nantes ==
In 1236, Gregory IX appointed him bishop of Nantes in the duchy of Brittany. Gregory may have considered him a good candidate for this position due to his experience with the emperor Frederick: the duke of Brittany, Peter of Dreux, and Peter's son, John, were accused of appropriating ecclesiastical property and causing damage to the church. Robert, however, was unable to resolve the dispute between the church and the dukes. He complained several times to Gregory in writing, and appealed to the pope in person in Rome in 1238. It is likely that he remained in Rome and never returned to Nantes.

Meanwhile, emperor Frederick claimed the regency of the Kingdom of Jerusalem for his underage son Conrad II, whose mother, queen Isabella II of Jerusalem, had died in childbirth. However, Frederick had been excommunicated by Gregory IX before departing for his crusade in 1229. The crusade recovered Jerusalem through a ten-year truce with al-Kamil, the sultan of Egypt. In preparation for the end of the truce, the Barons' Crusade (including Peter of Dreux) was present in the east in 1239-1240 and managed to retain control over Jerusalem.

== Patriarch of Jerusalem ==
Around the same time, probably in 1238 just before the Barons' Crusade, the patriarch of Jerusalem Gerold of Lausanne died. The canons of the Church of the Holy Sepulchre in Jerusalem selected the former Bishop of Acre, James of Vitry, as his replacement, but James hated Acre and had returned to Italy long before, and it is unlikely that he would be willing to return. Gregory's next choice was apparently Lando, the archbishop of Messina, who reported the news to the emperor and received Frederick's congratulations and support. For unknown reasons, perhaps due to his close relationship with Frederick, Lando was never confirmed as patriarch. Instead, on May 14, 1240 (shortly after James's death on May 1), Gregory chose Robert. Gregory likely appointed Robert because of his earlier experience with Frederick in Apulia.

Robert remained in Italy on a mission to Genoa, where he helped procure ships to bring bishops to Rome for a council in which Gregory planned to depose Frederick as emperor. However this fleet was defeated at the Battle of Giglio in 1241 and many of the bishops were taken prisoner. A few months later in August 1241, Gregory died. After the very brief reign of Pope Celestine IV (October-November 1241), the papacy remained vacant while Frederick tried to force the cardinals to elect a pope who would be friendly to the empire. The stalemate lasted until 1243 when Pope Innocent IV was elected.

Robert's whereabouts during this time are unknown but presumably he remained in Genoa, the hometown of Innocent IV, and did not dare to venture out into the rest of northern Italy that was controlled by Frederick. Innocent confirmed Robert's appointment as patriarch and papal legate in the east, and in the summer of 1244, Robert finally sailed from Genoa to Acre. Robert made a pilgrimage to Jerusalem, but soon after his arrival, the Khwarazmian Turks captured Jerusalem in August.

The Khwarazmians had allied with the Ayyubid sultan of Egypt as-Salih Ayyub (the son of al-Kamil). In response, Robert and the other leaders of the Kingdom of Jerusalem concluded an alliance with the Ayyubid emir of Damascus as-Salih Ismail. The combined Egyptian-Khwarizmian army defeated the joint crusader-Syrian army at the Battle of Forbie in October of 1244. According to his own account, Robert "miraculously survived" and escaped to nearby Ascalon. Since so many of the other leaders of Jerusalem had been killed or taken prisoner, at this point Robert was "the most important single person in the kingdom." He helped organize the defence of the kingdom from any further Egyptian-Khwarizmian attacks and was responsible for calling for support from the pope and other leaders back in Europe.

== Seventh Crusade ==
Although Innocent IV intended Louis IX of France to lead a new crusade, Robert targeted Henry III of England. In 1247, Robert sent Henry a relic of the Holy Blood, but his attempt to recruit the English king was unsuccessful.

In 1248, Louis arrived in the east, bringing with him a new papal legate to replace Robert, Odo of Chateauroux. Louis invaded Egypt in June 1249. The port of Damietta was captured immediately, and the crusaders remained there until February 1250, when Louis advanced toward Cairo. However, Louis was defeated and taken prisoner at the Battle of Fariskur. Louis and the rest of the crusader army was held in prison until May. In the meantime, the Ayyubid government was overthrown by its Mamluk slave soldiers. Robert arrived to negotiate Louis' release in May, but he was imprisoned along with the king, tortured, and threatened with execution. The Mamluks released Louis, Robert, and the other prisoners for an enormous ransom and the return of Damietta. The crusaders either returned home to France, or travelled to Acre, where Louis spent the next four years rebuilding and repairing the kingdom's fortifications.

== Death ==
Louis returned home in the spring of 1254. Odo of Chateauroux, who had replaced Robert as legate, had also been acting as the de facto patriarch; perhaps Robert was too old or sick, or had never fully recovered from the injuries he suffered in captivity in Egypt. According to Louis' biographer John of Joinville, Robert was already "an old and venerable man aged eighty years" in 1250. Robert died on 8 June 1254. Odo continued to act as patriarch until he also returned to Europe later in the year. Opizzo Fieschi, the Latin patriarch of Antioch, may have attempted to get himself elected as the new patriarch of Jerusalem, but his uncle Innocent IV died before he could confirm this choice. Innocent's successor Pope Alexander IV appointed the bishop of Verdun and future pope James Pantaleon as Robert's successor.

== Sources ==
- Hamilton, Bernard (1980). The Latin Church in the Crusader States: The Secular Church. Taylor & Francis. ISBN 978-0-86-078072-4.
- Vincent, Nicholas (2006). The Holy Blood: King Henry III and the Westminster Blood Relic. Cambridge University Press. ISBN 0-521-57128-6.
- Smith, Caroline (2008). Joinville and Villehardouin: Chronicles of the Crusades. Penguin. ISBN 978-0-75-465363-9.
- Bishop, Adam M. (2024). Robert of Nantes, Patriarch of Jerusalem (1240-1254). Routledge. ISBN 978-1-03-226704-3.

Catholic Church titles
Preceded by Henry I	Bishop of Nantes; 1236-1240	Succeeded by Galeran
Preceded by Gerold of Lausanne	Latin Patriarch of Jerusalem; 1240-1254	Succeeded by James Pantaleon
