= Treaty of San Germano =

1230 treaty between the Holy Roman Empire and the papacy

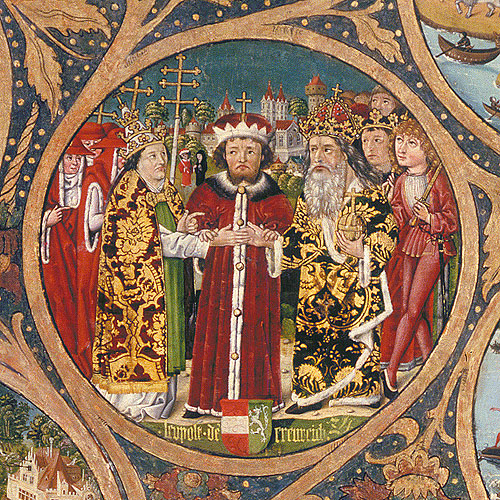
Leopold VI reconciling Gregory IX and Frederick II, from the Babenberger Stammbaum, a monumental painting from 1489–1492 in Klosterneuburg Monastery

The Treaty of San Germano was signed on 23 July 1230 at San Germano, present-day Cassino, ending the War of the Keys that had begun in 1228. The parties were Pope Gregory IX and Frederick II, king of Sicily and Holy Roman emperor. On 28 August at Ceprano, the peace was finalized with the readmission of the excommunicated Frederick into the church.

The negotiations for the treaty, initiated by Frederick, began in November 1229. The Lombard League, an ally of Gregory, objected to the process. The intercession of major German princes, especially Duke Leopold VI of Austria and Grand Master Hermann von Salza, was necessary to move things forward. The most important negotiator on the papal side was Cardinal Thomas of Capua, although Gregory's actual representative at the signing was Guala de Roniis.

In territorial terms, the treaty essentially restored the status quo ante bellum. Frederick recognized the Papal State and Gregory recognized Frederick as king of Sicily and emperor unimpaired. A general amnesty was issued. The biggest concession was Frederick's surrender of his special rights over the church in Sicily. Nevertheless, the treaty has often been regarded as a victory for the emperor.

== Background ==
The causes of the War of the Keys were Frederick's failure to lead the Sixth Crusade on the schedule he had agreed and his alleged violations of ecclesiastical rights, especially in the Papal State in central Italy. In October 1227, Gregory excommunicated Frederick. In June 1228, Frederick left on the Sixth Crusade without Gregory's approval. During his absence, his lieutenants, with various excuses, invaded the Papal State. Gregory absolved his subjects of their oaths of allegiance and launched a war into the dispute central Italian territory and into southern Italy, with the goal of confiscating the Kingdom of Sicily.

The papal forces cleared the Papal States of imperial troops, but their advance in Sicily was slow and finances were short. Frederick, having successfully recovered Jerusalem on crusade, returned to Italy and quickly threw the papal forces back on their own territory. Several sieges were still grinding on when peace feelers were first extended by Frederick.

== Negotiations ==
The initiative for peace had not come from Gregory, but from Frederick and probably also some members of the college of cardinals. In October 1229, the Roman Senate bypassed Gregory and opened negotiations with Frederick. On 4 November, Cardinal Thomas of Capua arrived in Aquino to open negotiations on behalf of the pope. On 10 November, Gregory gave Cardinal John of Colonna the power to absolve Frederick of his excommunication. The same day he informed his ally, the Lombard League, that he had opened negotiations. On 11 November, he wrote to Frederick formally expressing his desire to accept him back into the church and make peace.

Thomas and John were the main papal negotiators. The letters and registers of Thomas are an important source for the process. Even so, he frequently refers to information that could only be shared orally. Frederick's negotiators were the Teutonic grand master Hermann von Salza, Archbishop Lando of Reggio and Archbishop Marinus of Bari. The negotiations were protracted, with embassies moving back and forth between the papal and imperial courts. Rains, however, left the roads in a poor state, impeding travel.

In February 1230, the Lombard League object to the negotiations. In March, Thomas informed Gregory that Frederick might give him what he wanted if he only lifted the excommunication immediately. In the end, the German princes intervened on behalf of Frederick to save the negotiations. In April 1230, however, to prevent him from taking part in the negotiations, Gregory renewed the excommunication of Rainald of Urslingen, who had led the invasion of the Papal States.

In May 1230, the papal representatives were prepared to lift Frederick's excommunication if the emperor only recognized papal possession of Gaeta and Sant'Agata dei Goti. He refused. A formula acceptable to both parties was finally agreed on 9 July.

== Terms ==
According to the terms of the peace, Frederick's excommunication would be lifted and all other papal acts against him canceled. A general amnesty was to be issued to those who had supported the pope. Exiles were permitted to return. The properties of the Templars and Hospitallers that Frederick had confiscated were to be returned, as were any lands he had seized from the Roman church. Frederick surrendered his traditional legatine authority over the Sicilian church, agreeing to free ecclesiastical elections and exempting the clergy from secular courts, taxes and tallages.

Frederick would recognize the independence of the Papal State. The status of Gaeta and Sant'Agata would be resolved by further discussion or arbitration within twelve months, leaving the pope with certain rights over two cities in the Sicilian kingdom. As a guarantee, the papacy would retain control of certain Sicilian castles until the execution of the treaty.

The pope would recognize the treaty of Jaffa of 1229, which had ended the Sixth Crusade and restored Jerusalem to Christian rule.

== Ceremonies ==
The public ceremony confirming the agreed "form of peace" was celebrated in San Germano on 23 July 1230. Frederick was present, while Gregory was personally represented by the friar Guala de Roniis. Church bells were rung. The assembly included princes and churchmen from Germany and Italy, several cardinals and imperial officials. The pope's charges against Frederick that led to his excommunication were publicly read by Patriarch Berthold of Aquileia, Archbishop Eberhard of Salzburg and Bishop Siegfried of Regensburg.

Count Thomas of Acerra, on Frederick's behalf, swore on the Gospels to obey the church and the agreed "form of peace". Oaths were then sworn by Frederick's fidejussores, princes who pledged that for eight months from the day his excommunication was lifted they would assure his compliance and fight for the church if he reneged. All the oaths were recorded in "testimonial letters", to which the parties affixed their seals, including the imperial golden bull. The originals would go in the papal archives with copies be distributed to everyone else.

After the ceremony, Guala returned to Rome. On 25 July, he was back in San Germano to lift the interdict that had been placed on it by Cardinal Pelagius of Albano during the war. On 28 July, Duke Leopold VI of Austria, who had played a leading role in negotiations, died suddenly. On 28 August at Ceprano, Thomas and John formally released Frederick II from his excommunication in a public ceremony. On 1 September, Gregory hosted Frederick in one of his family's houses in Anagni. The two shared the kiss of peace and held talks both in private and in public. The scene was staged as of a father (Gregory) receiving back a prodigal son (Frederick). Gregory on this occasion pardoned all the Sicilian bishops who had stayed loyal to Frederick. On 2 September, they supped together with Hermann von Salza. Their meeting is described both in Gregory's biography in the Liber censuum and in Frederick's letters. Independent accounts are in the Chronica regia Coloniensis and Breve chronicon de rebus Siculis.

In September, Frederick issued an encyclical describing the ceremony of 28 August to all of Europe. Gregory sent out letters in the following months. These public ceremonies helped assure the public that peace had been reached.

== Enforcement ==
The enforcement of the terms of the treaty did not go entirely smoothly. On 15 October 1230, Gregory wrote to Frederick demanding amnesty for some of his supporters in the Capitanata. On 19 January 1231, he wrote reminding the emperor to restore the confiscated properties of the Templars and Hospitallers. As late as the summer of 1233, the status of the citizens of Gaeta in Frederick's eyes was an open question.

In the aftermath of the treaty, Berthold of Urslingen rebelled against Frederick. In or after May 1231, he withdrew to Antrodoco, where his brother, Duke Rainald, tried to induce him to submit. He was besieged by imperial forces and surrendered to Henry of Morra in July 1233, after which he and Rainald left Sicily.

== Analysis ==
Modern historians tend to see Frederick's behaviour after his landing in Italy as highly restrained. He quickly reversed almost all the papal conquests and the initiated peace negotiations rather than invade Papal State. It has been recognized that his ability to govern while excommunicated was severely hampered. Insofar as he succeeded in having his excommunication lifted and Gregory failed to bring the Sicilian kingdom under his control, the peace has been viewed as a victory for Frederick. The public ceremonies, however, were carefully staged to preserve the pope's honour. Peter Partner argues that the treaty of San Germano shows how the pope's power was actually independent of his military capabilities.

== Bibliography ==
- Abulafia, David (1988). Frederick II: A Medieval Emperor. Allen Lane.
- Brentano, Robert (1994). A New World in a Small Place: Church and Religion in the Diocese of Rieti, 1188–1378. University of California Press.
- Carbonetti Vendittelli, Cristina (2005). "Pace di San Germano (1230)". Enciclopedia Federiciana. Vol. 2. Istituto dell'Enciclopedia Italiana Treccani.
- Loud, G. A. (2016) [2011]. "The Papal 'Crusade' against Frederick II in 1228–1230". In Michel Balard (ed.). La Papauté et les croisades / The Papacy and the Crusades. Routledge. pp. 91–103.
- Matthew, Donald (1992). The Norman Kingdom of Sicily. Cambridge University Press.
- Partner, Peter (1972). The Lands of St. Peter: The Papal State in the Middle Ages and the Early Renaissance. University of California Press.
- Schaller, Hans Martin (1993). "Eboli, Tommaso di". Dizionario Biografico degli Italiani (in Italian). Vol. 42: Dugoni–Enza. Rome: Istituto dell'Enciclopedia Italiana. pp. 266–271. ISBN 978-88-12-00032-6.
- Tyerman, Christopher (2007). God's War: A New History of the Crusades. Penguin.
- Van Cleve, Thomas C. (1969). "The Crusade of Frederick II". In R. L. Wolff; H. W. Hazard (eds.). A History of the Crusades, Volume II: The Later Crusades, 1189–1311. University of Wisconsin Press. pp. 429–462.
- Whalen, Brett Edward (2019). The Two Powers: The Papacy, the Empire, and the Struggle for Sovereignty in the Thirteenth Century. University of Pennsylvania Press.
