= Lando (archbishop of Messina) =

Catholic bishop

Lando (died 1248 or 1249) was the archbishop of Reggio in Calabria from 1218 to 1232, and archbishop of Messina from 1232 until his death.

== Early life ==
Lando was born into an aristocratic family in Anagni, although very little is known about family. However his origins in Anagni were probably a benefit for his later career, as the cardinals Ugolino of Ostia (the future Pope Gregory IX) and Rinaldo of Ostia (later Pope Alexander IV) were also from Anagni.

Nothing is known of Lando's early life, but he must have become a member of clergy of the papal court in Rome, through the influence of his colleagues Ugolino and Rinaldo.

== Episcopal career ==
In 1218 he was named archbishop of Reggio by Pope Honorius III. Lando's diocese in Reggio was part of the Kingdom of Sicily, ruled by Frederick II, Holy Roman Emperor. At the time of Lando's appointment in 1218, Frederick was away in Germany asserting his rights to the Kingdom of Germany and the Holy Roman Empire. When Frederick returned to Sicily in 1221, Lando became a familiaris of the emperor and served as an ambassador from Frederick to the papal court. In 1222 he was appointed a commission to make judgements on disputed elections in the dioceses of Calabria, along with Lucas, bishop of Cosenza. In 1224 he was assigned to judge the case of Aldoin, bishop of Cefalu, who had been expelled from his diocese by Frederick.

Frederick planned to go on crusade in 1227 but had to turn back when a disease spread through his fleet. For breaking his vow as a crusader, Gregory IX excommunicated him. Lando was sent to negotiate with Gregory to undo the sentence, but he was unsuccessful.

Frederick eventually did go on crusade in 1228. Lando accompanied him and helped negotiate the Treaty of Jaffa between Frederick and the sultan of Egypt, al-Kamil, through which Jerusalem was returned to the Christians. Lando then returned to Italy to report the news to Pope Gregory. While Frederick was away, a papal army invaded southern Italy in 1229, forcing Frederick to return home. Lando again acted as an ambassador between the emperor and the pope and helped negotiate the Treaty of San Germano in 1230.

In 1232 Lando was transferred to the archdiocese of Messina. By this time Lando was concerned that "envious" people were trying to turn Frederick against him, and he was "very much afraid of losing the royal favour." The next year there was a rebellion against Frederick and the emperor may have blamed Lando. Whether Lando had anything to do with it or not, Frederick stopped using him as an ambassador. Lando and Frederick apparently reconciled by 1238 when the emperor sent him to negotiate with the pope again, in the context of Frederick's war with the Lombard League. Frederick was excommunicated by the pope and he began to plan a military expedition against Rome itself. Frederick must have once again considered Lando a trusted confidant, as he explained his strategy in detail in letters to the archbishop.

By this point, Lando had already abandoned Messina and had returned to his hometown in Anagni in 1238. In 1239 he reported to Frederick that he had been appointed the new Latin patriarch of Jerusalem, although he never served there, possibly because pope Gregory was suspicious of Lando's reconciliation with the emperor. Robert of Nantes was elected instead. When Gregory died in 1241, the election of a successor was delayed for almost 2 years because of Frederick's siege of Rome. The cardinals fled to Anagni, where Lando joined them in appealing to Frederick to end the siege. As he was not a cardinal himself, he did not participate in the 1243 papal election in which Innocent IV became pope. Lando remained in Anagni and died in 1248 or 1249.

== Sources ==
- Pybus, H.J. (1930). "The emperor Frederick II and the Sicilian church". The Cambridge Historical Journal. 3.
- Kamp, Norbert (1975). Kirche und Monarchie im staufischen Königreich Sizilien: I. Prosopographische Grundlegung: Bistümer und Bischöfe des Konigreichs 1194–1266: 2. Apulien und Kalabrien. Wilhelm Fink.
- Abulafia, David (1992). Frederick II: A Medieval Emperor. Oxford University Press. ISBN 978-0-19-508040-7.
- Bishop, Adam M. (2024). Robert of Nantes, Patriarch of Jerusalem (1240-1254). Routledge. ISBN 978-1-03-226704-3.

Catholic Church titles
Preceded by Giraldus	Archbishop of Reggio; 1218-1232	Succeeded by Vernaccio
Preceded by Berardo	Archbishop of Messina; 1232-1248	Succeeded by Giovanni Colonna
