= Trimberg =

Trimberg is a town in the Elfershausen municipality in Bavaria, Germany.

- The surname von Trimberg is that of the medieval noble family of the eponymous castle Trimburg.
  - Hugo von Trimberg
- Süßkind von Trimberg is a medieval poet of uncertain historicity
- 2990 Trimberger is an asteroid
