= Treaty of Jaffa (1229) =

Truce ending the Sixth Crusade

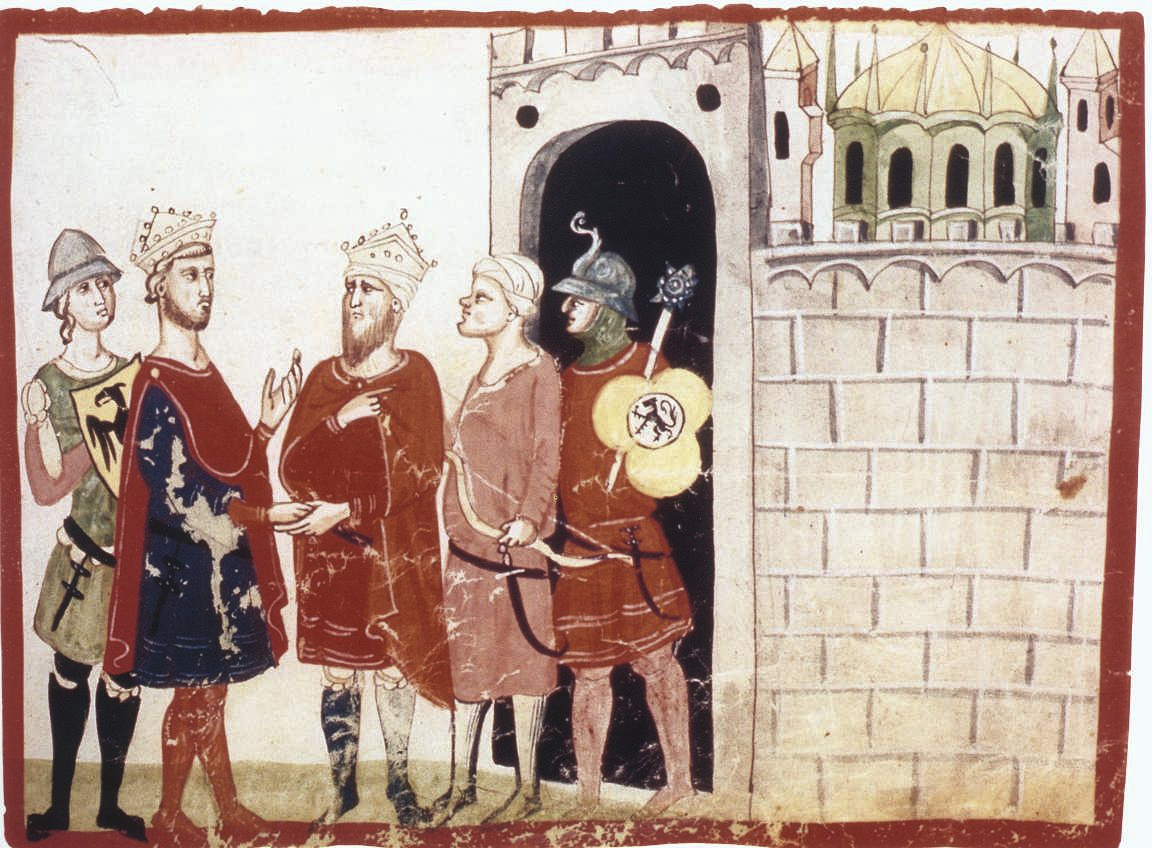
Frederick and al-Kāmil meet, from a 14th-century copy of the Nuova Cronica. In fact, the two sovereigns did not meet but merely exchanged embassies.

The Treaty of Jaffa, sometimes the Treaty of Jaffa and Tall al-ʿAjūl, was an agreement signed on 18 February 1229 between Frederick II, Holy Roman emperor and king of Sicily, and al-Kāmil, Ayyubid sultan of Egypt. It brought an end to the Sixth Crusade, led by Frederick, by restoring the city of Jerusalem and a few other territories to the Kingdom of Jerusalem, whose king at the time was Frederick's infant son Conrad.

Negotiations lasted from September 1228 to February 1229. The two sovereigns did not meet in person, but exchanged envoys in their respective camps, at first Acre for Frederick and Nablus for al-Kāmil, later Jaffa and Tall al-ʿAjūl. The negotiations were conducted mostly in secret to avoid bad publicity. They were accompanied by the exchange of gifts, entertainment and scholarship. Simultaneously, al-Kāmil negotiated with his brother al-Ashraf for a redistribution of Ayyubid lands in Asia.

The text of the treaty is not preserved. Its terms are known only from descriptions in various Christian and Muslim writers. These are generally in agreement. The sultan ceded the castle of Toron and the city of Jerusalem, with Bethlehem and a corridor of territory connecting it to the rest of the kingdom. He also recognized the Christian possession of Nazareth and Sidon. The Muslim holy places in Jerusalem, the Ḥaram al-Sharīf, were left under Muslim control, but Christians were to have access. While Christian accounts claim that Frederick had a right to refortify Jerusalem, Muslim accounts deny this.

The treaty was regarded as a disaster in the Muslim world and was barely better received in the Christian. The possession of Jerusalem was of religious and not military significance. It was not refortified.

== Background ==
Frederick II made diplomatic contacts with the Ayyubids as early as he made his vow to go on a crusade. In 1215 and again in 1220, at his royal and imperial coronations, respectively, he made the crusader's vow. In April 1213, Pope Innocent III proclaimed a new crusade, what became the Fifth Crusade. As early as 1213 (or possibly 1217), Frederick sent a diplomatic envoy, John of Cicala, to the Ayyubid courts in Cairo and Damascus. At the time, the Ayyubid sultan was al-ʿĀdil I, co-ruling in Egypt with his son al-Kāmil while his other son, al-Muʿaẓẓam, ruled in Damascus.

According to the History of the Patriarchs of Alexandria, Frederick II and al-Kāmil exchanged three embassies in 1227. Frederick first sent envoys to Egypt in 1227. When these returned to Sicily, they brought with them al-Kāmil's envoy, Fakhr al-Dīn. A second embassy from Frederick then followed al-Kāmil's envoy home, where they arrived in September or October 1227. Archbishop Berardo di Castagna was among Frederick's envoys. Thomas of Aquino, who had been sent ahead in July or August, joined the embassy in Egypt. He then travelled from Cairo to Damascus to meet al-Muʿaẓẓam.

The Arabic chronicles generally agree that al-Kāmil sought Frederick's military aid against the alliance of al-Muʿaẓẓam with the Khwarazmians. They agree that he offered Frederick land in exchange. Ibn Wāṣil, al-Makīn, Abū al-Fidāʾ and Ibn Khaldūn say that he offered him Jerusalem, but al-Maqrīzī says that he offered only some coastal territories. Frederick's envoys met with al-Muʿaẓẓam to demand the return of the lands conquered by his uncle, Saladin. They were received coldly. Berardo di Castagna returned to Sicily with gifts from al-Kāmil in January 1228.

Shortly after the imperial embassy left Damascus, al-Muʿaẓẓam died, leaving a twelve-year-old heir, al-Nāṣir Dāʾūd, who appealed to another uncle, al-Ashraf, for assistance against al-Kāmil, who had marched north to Nablus intending to take control of his late brother's lands. This put him in control of Jerusalem, but the family dispute was unresolved when the Sixth Crusade landed in Syria.

On the eve of his crusade, Frederick's wife, Queen Isabella II of Jerusalem died, leaving their infant son, Conrad, as king of Jerusalem with Frederick, erstwhile king consort, as regent.

== Negotiations ==
Frederick II departed on crusade on 28 June 1228 and arrived in Acre, the capital of the Kingdom of Jerusalem, on 7 September. Frederick immediately sent an embassy that included Thomas of Aquino and Balian of Sidon. They arrived with gifts at the sultan's camp in Nablus in early October. From Nablus, al-Kāmil sent him gifts before moving his camp south to Tall al-ʿAjūl. Thomas and Balian returned to Nablus only to be informed that the sultan had moved south. Frederick then moved his camp south to Jaffa. Thereafter, envoys moved back and forth between the two camps. The main negotiator for al-Kāmil was Fakhr al-Dīn, who was assisted by Shams al-Dīn and Ṣalāḥ al-Dīn al-Irbilī.

Frederick's initial demand of al-Kāmil was the fulfillment of the promise made the previous year to hand over Jerusalem. The sultan, having invited Frederick to Syria, could not easily refuse. The negotiations were largely kept secret. Frederick was able to converse directly with Fakhr al-Dīn in Arabic. Some aspects of the negotiations scandalized contemporaries. According to Roger of Wendover, he procured "Christian dancing women" for the Muslims envoys entertainment and cohabitation. The Patriarch Gerold of Jerusalem wrote that the sultan sent Frederick "dancing girls and jugglers ... of ill repute."

As negotiations were ongoing, Frederick sent al-Kāmil questions on philosophy, geometry and mathematics to see if his scholars could provide answers. Among the scholars the sultan utilized in this exchange, according to Ibn Wāṣil, was ʿAlam al-Dīn Qayṣar. According to Ibn Naẓīf, when Frederick requested a meeting with an esteemed astronomer, the sultan sent him ʿAlam al-Dīn.

The negotiations with Frederick's envoys were not the only ones taking place at Tall al-ʿAjūl. On 10 November 1228, al-Ashraf arrived in the sultan's camp, ostensibly to prevent him from ceding territory to the crusaders but in reality to negotiate the future of Damascus and all Ayyubid lands in Asia. The talks took at least two months, but were completed before the final agreement with Frederick. According to brothers' agreement, Damascus and its dependencies were to go to al-Ashraf. This included southern Lebanon, Mount Hermon, the Anti-Lebanon, the Ḥawrān, the Jabal al-Durūz and Galilee. The rest of Palestine and the Transjordan were to go to al-Kāmil. For the loss of Damascus, al-Nāṣir was to be compensated with the Diyār Muḍar. Formerly belonging to al-Ashraf, this included the cities of Edessa, Ḥarrān, Raqqa and Raʾs al-ʿAyn. In addition, al-ʿAzīz ʿUthmān was to receive Baalbek; al-Muẓaffar Maḥmūd was to receive Ḥamā, Baʿrīn and Maʿarrat al-Nuʿmān; and al-Mujāhid ibn Shīrkūh was to receive Salamiyya.

During all these negotiations, Frederick's position, weakened at the outset by his status as an excommunicate, was weakened further by Pope Gregory IX, who launched an invasion of Sicily while negotiations were ongoing. His army was not sufficient to take and hold Jerusalem. An Arabic letter supposedly sent by Frederick to al-Kāmil—but of questionable authenticity—reads:

You must be aware that I am supreme among all the princes of the West. It is you who caused me to come here. The kings and the pope know of my expedition. If I return without having obtained something, I shall lose all respect in their eyes. After all, is not the city of Jerusalem the place of birth of the Christian religion? Have you not destroyed it? It now stands in direst need. Give it back to me in the condition in which it is so that upon my return home I may hold up my head among the kings. I renounce in advance all advantages which I might obtain from it.

According to al-Maqrīzī, the sultan finally agreed to terms because without an agreement with Frederick he would be unable to enforce the terms of his agreement with al-Ashraf, which would require a siege of Damascus. A draft agreement was reached by the negotiating teams on 11 February 1229 (15 Rabīʿ al-ʾAwwal 626 in the Islamic calendar). The final version was accepted by the sovereigns on 18 February (22 Rabīʿ al-ʾAwwal).

== Terms ==
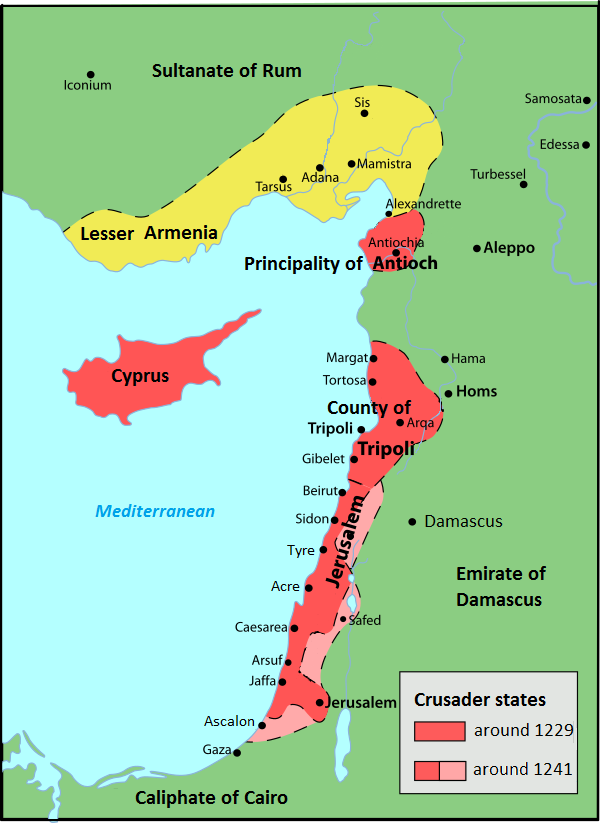
Map of the Crusader states after the treaty of Jaffa

A complete copy of the treaty does not survive. Its terms must be reconstructed from fragments and descriptions in various Christian and Muslim sources. These do not always agree. The main Muslim sources are Ibn Abī al-Dam's al-Taʾrīkh, Ibn al-Athīr's al-Kāmil fī al-Taʾrīkh, Ibn Wāṣil's Mufarrij and Kamāl al-Dīn ibn al-ʿAdīm's Zubda. The main Christian sources are the letters of the Patriarch Gerold, the Teutonic master Hermann von Salza and the Emperor Frederick himself to his brother-in-law, King Henry III of England. The last is incorporated into the chronicle of Roger of Wendover.

According to the terms of the treaty, the city of Jerusalem was handed over to the emperor along with a corridor of territory, including the diocese of Lydda, connecting it to the kingdom's coastal possessions and Acre. In the city, the Ḥaram al-Sharīf was to remain in Muslim hands with a Muslim garrison and a qāḍī (judge), both Christians and Muslim pilgrims were to have access to the site and the right to pray there. All other Muslims in Jerusalem were to leave. Jews, too, were to leave. The Christian sources record that Bethlehem and the land between it and Jerusalem were ceded to Frederick, although Muslims were to be allowed access to the town. This is not recorded in the Muslims sources, which may have simply regarded Bethlehem as falling under Jerusalem. They record that the villages in the vicinity of Jerusalem, including Hebron, were to remain under a Muslim governor (wālī), whose seat was in al-Bīra.

The treaty recognized the Christian possession of Acre, Jaffa, Nazareth, Sidon and Toron. This was mostly the recognition of places already possessed. Nazareth had been conquered in 1204 and Sidon occupied at the beginning of Frederick's crusade. Toron, in a state of ruin, was ceded as a sign of friendship. The treaty stipulated a truce of ten years, five months and forty days from 24 February (28 Rabīʿ al-ʾAwwal). This was within the maximum of ten years and ten months prescribed for a truce with the infidel in Islamic law. The truce obligated Frederick not to support any Christian attack on al-Kāmil. It also provided for the exchange of prisoners.

The largest discrepancy between the Christian and Muslim accounts concerns whether Frederick had the right to refortify Jerusalem. The walls of Jerusalem had been preemptively dismantled by al-Muʿaẓẓam during the Fifth Crusade in 1219. The Muslims sources report that Frederick was not to rebuild them. In his letter to Henry III, however, Frederick claims that he was permitted to rebuild the city "in as good a state as it had ever been". Possibly only the walls of the city could be repaired. Whatever the rights conferred by the treaty of Jaffa, Jerusalem was not refortified during the ten years of the treaty.

== Implementation ==
Frederick II entered Jerusalem on 17 March, escorted by the qāḍī of Nablus, Shams al-Dīn. He was crowned in the Church of the Holy Sepulchre the following day. On 19 March, in accordance with the patriarch's instructions, the Archbishop Peter of Caesarea, placed Jerusalem under interdict and closed its shrines because the terms of the treaty had been negotiated by an excommunicate.

The sultan waited in Tall al-ʿAjūl until late April, both to be nearby during the handover of the city and to put pressure on al-Ashraf, who needed his assistance to take Damascus, into renegotiating their deal. In the end, al-Ashraf agreed to give Diyār Muḍar to al-Kāmil with al-Nāṣir to be compensated in Palestine and Transjordan.

The expulsion of Jews from Jerusalem meant the effective end of Jewish pilgrimage, since there were no places for Jews to stay. This was eventually remedied by an agreement with some Jewish pilgrims that a Jewish dyer could live in the city, thus providing a place for Jewish pilgrims to stay.

== Reaction ==
The reaction to the treaty in both the Christian and Muslim worlds was largely negative. Because of the secrecy with which it was negotiated, even al-Kāmil's relatives were largely in the dark as to what he intended to concede until the treaty was publicized. The exception was al-Ashraf, who arrived in Tall al-ʿAjūl during negotiations. Although Sibṭ ibn al-Jawzī implies that al-Ashraf was disturbed by the cession of Jerusalem, he was appeased by the acquisition of Damascus.

Ibn al-Athīr and Badr al-Dīn al-ʿAynī record the strong negative reaction that the treaty of Jaffa produced in the Muslim world. To buttress his position in besieged Damascus, al-Nāṣir Dāʾūd had Sibṭ ibn al-Jawzī preach a sermon in the Umayyad Mosque denouncing the treaty and extolling the sanctity of Jerusalem. Public opinion in the Muslim world had not been prepared for the loss of Jerusalem, the conquest of which by Saladin in 1187 was the glory of the Ayyubid dynasty. To al-Kāmil, Jerusalem was both militarily insignificant and indefensible. Its recapture after the expiration of the truce would be facile. He defended his decision with the words:

We have only conceded to them some churches and some ruined houses. The sacred precincts, the venerated Rock and all the other sanctuaries to which we make our pilgrimages remain ours as they were; Muslim rites continue to flourish as they did before, and the Muslims have their own governor of the rural provinces and districts.

To the crusaders in Frederick's army, the treaty was seen as a major accomplishment. The German poet Freidank, writing of the recovery of Jerusalem, asked, "What more can sinners desire / Than the sepulchre and the glorious cross?" Another poet in Frederick's service, the troubadour Guillem Figueira, praised the treaty of Jaffa, singing that Frederick "brought about an honourable, clean achievement in the Holy Land when he conquered Jerusalem and Ascalon, for before a bolt or arrow had been fired at him the sultan made him a good and honourable peace". Beyond his own followers, Frederick's treaty was seen as an abandonment of the crusade ideal and a shameful compromise. The ecclesiastical hierarchy and the military orders, the Templars and Hospitallers, were angered by the terms Frederick had accepted. In part, this was because they had not been consulted and had no say in the acceptance of the treaty.

== Bibliography ==
- Abulafia, David (1988). Frederick II: A Medieval Emperor. Allen Lane.
- Boas, Adrian J. (2001). Jerusalem in the Time of the Crusades: Society, Landscape and Art in the Holy City under Frankish Rule. Routledge.
- Humphreys, R. Stephen (1977). From Saladin to the Mongols: The Ayyubids of Damascus, 1193–1260. State University of New York Press.
- Kamp, Norbert (1975). Kirche und Monarchie im staufischen Königreich Sizilien, 1: Prosopographische Grundlegung: Bistümer und Bischöfe des Königreichs 1194–1266, 3: Sizilien. Wilhelm Fink.
- Paterson, Linda (2018). Singing the Crusades: French and Occitan Lyric Responses to the Crusading Movements, 1137–1336. D. S. Brewer.
- Prawer, Joshua (1988). The History of the Jews in the Latin Kingdom of Jerusalem. Oxford University Press.
- Takayama, Hiroshi (2010). "Frederick II's Crusade: An Example of Christian–Muslim Diplomacy". Mediterranean Historical Review. 25 (2): 169–185. doi:10.1080/09518967.2010.540419. S2CID 162571360.
- Tyerman, Christopher (2007). God's War: A New History of the Crusades. Penguin.
- Van Cleve, Thomas C. (1969). "The Crusade of Frederick II". In R. L. Wolff; H. W. Hazard (eds.). A History of the Crusades, Volume II: The Later Crusades, 1189–1311. University of Wisconsin Press. pp. 429–462.
- Van Cleve, Thomas C. (1972). The Emperor Frederick II of Hohenstaufen: Immutator Mundi. Clarendon Press.
