= Freidank =

Freidank (Vrîdanc) was a Middle High German didactic poet of the early 13th century. He is the author of Bescheidenheit ("practical wisdom, correct judgement, discretion"), a collection of rhyming aphorisms in 53 thematic divisions, extending to some 4,700 verses. The work was extremely popular in the German Middle Ages and is transmitted in numerous manuscripts, as well as in a Latin translation (Fridangi Discretio).

== Life ==
Nothing about Freidank's life is known with certainty, such hypotheses as there are based on the language and content of his work Bescheidenheit. He would have been born in the later 12th century, and was likely of Swabian origin.

Freidank (Vrîdanc, Vrîgedanc) literally translates to "free thought"; passages in Freidank's poetry allude to the freedom of thought, and the name may be an assumed epithet, although Freidank (Fridanc, Fridangus) is also recorded as a German family name in the later medieval period; one Bernhard Freidank is mentioned in Helbling's Lucidarius (but it has been argued that this may in fact be a reference to the poet himself.). Wilhelm Grimm (1834) argued that the author is Vrîdanc is a pseudonym and that the author of Bescheidenheit is Walter von der Vogelweide. This hypothesis was immediately rejected by the majority of scholars; according to Bartsch (1878), the only German philologist convinced by Grimm's idea was Wackernagel.

Based on the contents of Bescheidenheit, its author was educated in writing and proper speech, and it is likely that he was a cleric by education. It seems likely that in 1228–1229 he was involved in the Sixth Crusade of the Hohenstaufen emperor Frederick II, as the section about Acre seems to refer to this period.

Freidank may have died in 1233, if he was the magister Fridancus whose death was reported in the annals of the Cistercian monastery at Kaisheim. The chronicler Hartmann Schedel claimed to have seen a monument with Freidank's epitaph in Venetian Treviso in 1465. Gion (1870) argued that the Freidank buried in Treviso died in the 1380s and is not to be confused with the author of the Bescheidenheit.

== Bescheidenheit ==
The didactic poem Bescheidenheit was composed in the early 13th century, between about 1215 and 1230. It is a collection of rhyming aphorisms in 53 thematic divisions and about 4,700 verses which encapsulate the folk wisdom and experience of the period. Critical editions of the work were published by Wilhelm Grimm (1834, second edition 1860) and by H. E. Bezzenberger (1872, reprinted 1962).

Due to its linguistic elegance, the work was very popular throughout the late medieval period and well into the German Renaissance. It has been transmitted in numerous manuscripts and also in a Latin translation ("Fridangi Discretio") and was quoted by contemporary authors, including Hugo von Trimberg and Rudolf von Ems. Manuscript editions gave way seamlessly to printed editions (Sebastian Brant, 1508). Some quotes have survived as proverbs still current in Modern German. The name of Freidank became a standard authority for wise sayings, and was often invoked as the author of gnomic sayings.

Grimm divided the work into 54 sections or chapters, as follows: 1. von gote (God), 1b. von dem avê Marjâ (Hail Mary), 2. von der messe (mass), 3. von der sele (the soul), 4. von dem menschen (Man), 5. von den juden (Jews), 6. von den ketzern (heretics), 7. von wuocher (usury), 8. von hôchverte (pride), 9. von der werlde (the world), 10. von sünden (sins), 11. von dem rîchen und armen (rich and poor), 12. von triuwe und untriuwe (faith/truth and faithlessness/untruth), 13. von dieben (thieves), 14. von spile (play, sport), 15. von dieneste (service), 16. von rehte und unrehte (right and wrong), 17. von dem alter (age), 18. von edele unde tugende' (nobility and virtue), 19. von blinden (the blind), 20. von dem honege (honey), 21. von gewinne und guote (profit and possessions), 22. von sorgen (sorrow), 23. von arzâten unde siechen (leeches and the sick), 24. von nîde (envy), 25. von lobe (praise), 26. von scheltenne (scolding), 27. von gesellen (fellowship), 28. von zorne (wrath), 29. von dem himelrîche und der helle (heaven and hell), 30. von den pfaffen (priests, clerics), 31. von künegen und fürsten (kings and princes), 32. von den wîsen unde tôren (the wise and fools), 33. von milten und von kargen (the generous and the avaricious), 34. von der 'ere (honour), 35. von trunkenheite (inebriation), 36. von friunden (friends), 37. von minne und wiben (love and women), 38. von erkantnisse (insight), 39. von dem hunger (hunger), 40. von wâne (madness), 41. von guote und übele (good and evil), 42. von unkünde (the unknown), 43. von tieren (beasts), 44. von schatze und pfenninge (wealth and money), 45. von Rôme (Rome), 46. von Âkers (Acre), 47. von der zungen (language), 48. von liegenne unde triegenne (lies and deceptions), 49. von dem Endekriste (the Antichrist), 50. von den zehen geboten (the Ten Commandments), 51. von dem tôde (death), 52. von dem jungesten tage (the Last Judgment), 53. ein gebet (a prayer).

== See also ==
- Goliard
- Der Renner

== Editions ==
- W. Grimm, Vridankes Bescheidenheit (1834; 2nd ed. 1860).
- H. E. Bezzenberger, Fridankes Bescheidenheit (1872).
