= Gerold of Lausanne =

Latin patriarch of Jerusalem in the 1200s

Gerold of Lausanne (Gerald, Gerard, Giraud; died 1238 or 1239), was abbot of Molesme, abbot of Cluny, bishop of Valence, and Latin patriarch of Jerusalem in the 13th century.

== Early life and career ==
Gerold was said to be from “Losane”, which has traditionally been interpreted as Lausanne. Otherwise his origins are obscure. He was a Cistercian monk who became abbot of Molesme Abbey in 1208, and then abbot of Cluny in 1215. In 1220 he was appointed bishop of Valence.

== Patriarch of Jerusalem ==
He is best-known as the Latin patriarch of Jerusalem from 1225 to 1238 or 1239. At the time, the crusader kingdom of Jerusalem was governed by John of Brienne, father of the infant heiress Isabella II. The city of Jerusalem itself was no longer part of the crusader kingdom, as it had been lost in 1187; the secular and ecclesiastical leadership resided in the coastal city of Acre.

John of Brienne arranged for Isabella to marry the Holy Roman emperor, Frederick II. In 1224, a proxy marriage was performed by the patriarch Ralph of Merencourt, who probably died shortly afterwards. Isabella then travelled to Italy to marry Frederick in person in 1225. Frederick claimed the regency of the crusader kingdom, and removed Isabella's father John from power; this meant there was neither a king or a patriarch residing in Acre. Also in 1225, the pope, Honorius III, appointed Gerold as patriarch. He did not go to the east immediately and in his absence, the church was run by Peter of Limoges, archbishop of Caesarea. Gerold came east with Frederick's crusade in 1227, although Frederick himself was too sick to travel with them. Because he had not gone on crusade as promised, Frederick was excommunicated by the new pope, Gregory IX.

Frederick eventually came to the east a year later in 1228, but as he was still excommunicated, Gerold and the other ecclesiastical leaders of the kingdom were unable to cooperate with him. It was expected that Frederick would invade Egypt or take Jerusalem by force, but instead he negotiated the return of Jerusalem with the sultan of Egypt, al-Kamil. Gerold was furious at the truce, which still allowed the Muslims to keep the Temple Mount (the headquarters of the Knights Templar until 1187), and it did not restore most of the church's territory in and around Jerusalem. He could not accept the return of Jerusalem to an excommunicated person under these terms, so on 18 March, 1229, the archbishop of Caesarea, acting on Gerold's behalf, placed Jerusalem under interdict, meaning no Christian religious services could be performed there.

Frederick retaliated by expelling Gerold from Acre, but he was forced to return home when Gregory IX allied with John of Brienne and invaded Frederick's territory in Sicily. Frederick was pelted with garbage as he left Acre. Frederick and Gregory eventually made peace and the emperor convinced the pope to recall Gerold to Rome, so from 1233 to 1237 there was no patriarch residing in Acre. When he returned in 1237, Gerold continued to live in Acre, and may have never visited Jerusalem.

The truce with Egypt was set for ten years and expired in 1239. A new crusade arrived, but it was defeated in a battle at Gaza. According to one version of the Estoire d'Eracles, a chronicle written in the crusader kingdom, Gerold participated in the crusade, but because pope Gregory was already searching for a new patriarch at this point, Gerold must have already died the year before in 1238. Gerold bequeathed 16,000 bezants to the Templars to help pay for the defence of the kingdom.

According to Bernard Hamilton, even though medieval Latin Christians in general were unwilling to share Jerusalem with Muslims, Gerold was still rather “bigoted” and thanks to his stubbornness “the recovery of the holy city remained largely a wasted opportunity.”

The canons of the church of the Holy Sepulchre in Acre elected the former bishop of Acre, James of Vitry, to replace Gerold. James hated Acre, which he had abandoned years before, so it is unlikely he would have returned as patriarch. Whether he knew about the election or not, James died in 1240. Gerold was succeeded by Robert of Nantes.

== Sources ==
- Mas Latrie, Louis de (1893). "Les patriarches latins de Jérusalem". Revue de l'Orient latin. 1.
- Jacobs, Wilhelm (1905). Patriarch Gerold von Jerusalem: Ein Beitrag zur Kreuzzugsgeschichte Friedrichs II.
- Hamilton, Bernard (1980). The Latin Church in the Crusader States: The Secular Church. Taylor & Francis. ISBN 978-0-86-078072-4.
- Powell, James M. (1999). "Patriarch Gerold and Frederick II: the Matthew Paris letter". Journal of Medieval History. 25.
- Bishop, Adam M. (2024). Robert of Nantes, Patriarch of Jerusalem (1240-1254). Routledge. ISBN 978-1-03-226704-3.

Catholic Church titles
Preceded by Walter I	Abbot of Molesme; 1208-1214	Succeeded by Odo II
Preceded by William II	Abbot of Cluny; 1215-1220	Succeeded by Roland of Hainaut
Preceded by Humbert of Miribel	Bishop of Valence; 1220-1225	Succeeded by William of Savoy
Preceded by Ralph of Merencourt	Latin Patriarch of Jerusalem; 1225–1238	Succeeded by Robert of Nantes
