= Fakhr al-Din ibn al-Shaykh =

Egyptian emir, and military commander (1221 – 1250)

- Born: 1211; Egypt
- Died: 8 February 1250 (aged 38); Egypt
- Religion: Sunni Islam
- Military career
- Conflicts: Seventh Crusade; Siege of Jerusalem (1244); Siege of Ascalon (1247); Battle of La Forbie

Fakhr al-Din ibn al-Shaykh (before 1211 – 8 February 1250) was an Egyptian emir of the Ayyubid Sultanate of Egypt. He served as a diplomat for sultan al-Kamil from 1226 to 1228 in his negotiations with the Holy Roman Emperor Frederick II leading to the end of the Sixth Crusade. He later commanded forces during the Seventh Crusade, dying at the Battle of al-Mansura in 1250.

== First embassy ==
Fakhr al-Din's ancestors came from Khorasan. His family was known as the Awlad al-Shaykh. His brothers were Imad al-Din and Mu'in al-Din.

Fakhr al-Din's first appearance in the historical record is as a diplomat. In late 1220 or early 1221, al-Kamil sent him to his brother, al-Ashraf, then ruling from Sinjar, to request assistance against the army of the Fifth Crusade. The mission was a not a success.

== The Sixth Crusade ==
In 1226, Fakhr al-Din was sent by sultan al-Kamil on a diplomatic mission to Sicily to the court of Frederick II, attempting to forestall the imminent Sixth Crusade, again hoping to regain Christian control of the Holy Land. He offered an alliance against his brother al-Mu'azzam, then emir of Damascus. As an inducement, al-Kamil renewed his earlier offer, made during the Fifth Crusade, of the return of Jerusalem. In 1227, Fakhr al-Din traveled again to Sicily. During the negotiations, he impressed the emperor who had him knighted. While in Sicily, news arrived from Frederick's envoy, Thomas of Aquino, that al-Mu'azzam had died on 11 November 1227. The crusade would not be averted.

When Frederick reached the Holy Land with his small army in the fall of 1228, Fakhr al-Din was once again sent by the sultan in order to dissuade him from continuing his expedition. The negotiations stalled and Frederick moved down the coast, but talks continued. Finally, on 18 February 1229, the al-Kamil's negotiators Fakhr al-Din and Salah al-Din of Arbela signed the Treaty of Jaffa with the emperor by handing over Jerusalem to the Christians along with other cities in Palestine.

== In the interim ==
If the Arabic sources are to be believed, Frederick II maintained a correspondence with Fakhr al-Din after his return to Europe. They record a letter purportedly from Frederick dated 23 August 1229 at Barletta, in which Frederick says, "As we explained to you in Sidon, the pope has treacherously and deceitfully taken one of our fortresses, called Montecassino", referring to the papal invasion of Sicily. Fakhr al-Din was present at the siege of Damascus between June and December 1229, acting as al-Kamil's envoy to the besieged an-Nasir Da'ud.

When al-Kamil died on 6 March 1238, he was succeeded by his sons, in Egypt by al-Adil II and in Syria, by al-Salih Ayyub. In 1239 the treaty with Frederick expired, and Jerusalem again was threatened. The next year al-Salih Ayyub defeated his brother and became sultan of Egypt. The Barons' Crusade of 1239–1241 increased the size of the Kingdom of Jerusalem, successfully pitting al-Salih Ayyub against his cousin al-Salih Ismail, now emir of Damascus.

At al-Salih Ayyub's invitation, the Khwarezmians advanced through Syria and Palestine and on 15 June 1244 successfully conducted the Siege of Jerusalem, leaving the city in ruins. In October 1244, al-Salih Ayyub, again allied to the Khwarezmians, defeated al-Salih Ismail, allied with the kingdom, at the Battle of La Forbie. In 1246, deciding that his Khwarezmian allies were dangerously uncontrollable, he turned on them and defeated them near Homs, killing their leader and dispersing the remnants throughout Syria and Palestine.

In 1247, Fakhr al-Din was a commander of the troops of sultan al-Salih Ayyub during his campaign through Palestine. He captured Tiberias, and at Ascalon, he took the castle rebuilt by Theobald I of Navarre and began dismantling it on 24 October 1247. This was the first Muslim offensive against the Crusaders since 1189.

== The Seventh Crusade ==
Al-Salih's capture of Jerusalem after the Khwarezmian sacking led to the call for the Seventh Crusade, and Louis IX of France took the cross. In 1248, the opening gambit of the crusade took place at Damietta in June 1249. There, Louis IX landed his forces only to be met by a strong garrison led by Fakhr al-Din. The French rout of the Egyptians was quick and turned out to be the high point of the expedition.

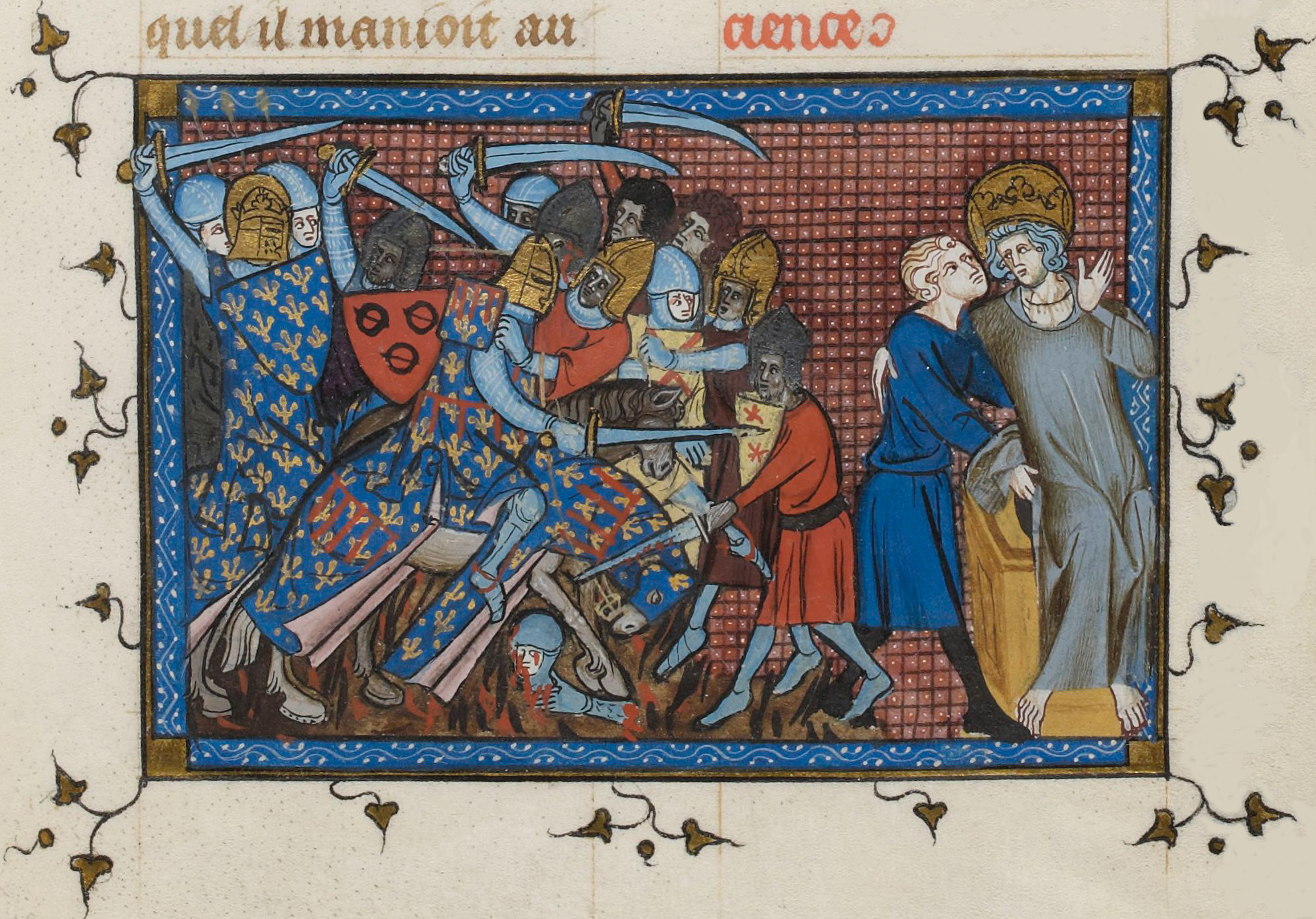
Painting of the Battle of Mansurah in 1250. BnF, Ms.Fr. 5716, c. 1330-1340

The sultan retaliated swiftly against the garrison, but was unable to replace Fakhr al-Din because of strong support among the veteran loyalists. Al-Salih Ayyub died suddenly on 22 November 1249, and Fakhr al-Din assumed command of the army. The sultan's death was kept quite while his son and successor al-Muazzam Turanshah was summoned from Syria. Turanshah did not arrive in Egypt until 27 February, and the sultanate was effectively ruled by al-Salih's widow Shajar al-Durr and Fakhr al-Din.

Fakhr al-Din moved with a newly formed army to Mansurah, taking command of the city's defense there. On 8 February 1250, the Crusaders crossed the Nile, beginning the Battle of Mansurah. Their vanguard under Robert I of Artois reached the opposite bank first and immediately attacked the camp of the Egyptian army, which was located in front of the city walls. Fakhr al-Din is said to have just taken a bath when he suddenly heard the noise of battle. He quickly dressed and placed himself at the head of his troops without armor. He rode with them to meet the enemy, but was overpowered and killed.

Because of his death, the troops fled. As a result, Robert felt encouraged to attack the city directly, as its gates were still open. There a commander and future sultan, Baibars, set a trap for him by locking the gates behind the Crusaders' backs and killing most of them in street fighting.

== Bibliography ==
- Abulafia, David (1988). Frederick II: A Medieval Emperor. Allen Lane.
- Asbridge, Thomas (2012). The Crusades: The War for the Holy Land. Simon & Schuster. ISBN 978-1-84983-688-3.
- Gibb, H. A. R. (1969). The Aiyūbids (PDF). A History of the Crusades (Setton), Volume II. Archived from the original (PDF) on 2023-03-26.
- Humphreys, R. Stephen (1977). From Saladin to the Mongols: The Ayyubids of Damascus, 1193–1260. State University of New York Press. ISBN 9780873952637.
- Irwin, Robert (1986). The Middle East in the Middle Ages: The Early Mamluk Sultanate, 1250-1382. Southern Illinois University Press. ISBN 9781597400480.
- Maalouf, Amin (2006). The Crusades through Arab Eyes. Saqi Books. ISBN 9780863560231.
- Runciman, Steven (1954). A History of the Crusades, Volume Three: The Kingdom of Acre and the Later Crusades. Cambridge University Press. ISBN 978-0521347723.
- Setton, Kenneth M. (1969). A History of the Crusades. Six Volumes. University of Wisconsin Press.
- Strayer, Joseph (1969). The Crusades of Louis IX (PDF). A History of the Crusades (Setton), Volume II. Archived from the original (PDF) on 2021-12-07.
- Tyerman, Christopher (2006). God's War: A New History of the Crusades. Belknap Press. ISBN 978-0-674-02387-1.
- Van Cleve, Thomas C. (1969). The Crusade of Frederick II (PDF). A History of the Crusades (Setton), Volume II. Archived from the original (PDF) on 2021-03-04.
