= Mu'in al-Din Hasan ibn al-Shaykh =

Vizier to the Ayyubid sultan of Egypt

Muʿīn al-Dīn Ḥasan ibn al-Shaykh (died 10/12 February 1246) was the vizier of the Ayyubid sultan of Egypt, al-Ṣāliḥ Ayyūb, from 1240 until his death.

Muʿīn al-Dīn belonged to a family known as the Awlād al-Shaykh. His ancestors came from Khorāsān. He was the youngest of four brothers. His elder brothers were Fakhr al-Dīn Yūsuf, ʿImād al-Dīn ʿUmar and Kamāl al-Dīn Aḥmad. Like his brothers, he was a ṣūfī who taught Shāfiʿī jurisprudence in Cairo before entering politics.

Muʿīn al-Dīn was appointed "deputy of the vizier" (nāʾib al-wizāra) by Sultan al-Kāmil. He was part of the council that, after al-Kāmil's death in 1240, elected al-Jawwād Yūnus as regent in Damascus. He was promoted to full vizier by al-Kāmil's successor, al-Ṣāliḥ Ayyūb, that same year. In 1243, he was part of the attempted rapprochement between the sultan and the Ayyubid emirs in Syria and the alliance with the Khwārazmians that caused its collapse. After the Egyptian–Khwārazmian victory over the Franks and Syrians at the battle of La Forbie in 1244, al-Ṣāliḥ Ayyūb, who had remained in Cairo, put Muʿīn al-Dīn in command of the army and sent it to capture Damascus.

For the 1245 campaign, Muʿīn al-Dīn was granted plenary powers, including the rights to use the royal pavilion (al-dihlīz al-sulṭānī) and be served by the royal staff. He joined the Khwārazmian army at Gaza and led the combined force to Baysān and thence to Damascus. The siege of Damascus began in May and lasted over four months. Negotiations for a surrender were conducted by Muʿīn al-Dīn and Amīn al-Dawla, vizier of Damascus. It was agreed that al-Ṣāliḥ Ismāʿīl would surrender Damascus but retain Baʿlabakk and his ally, al-Manṣūr Ibrāhīm, would retain Ḥimṣ. Both received a safeconduct and Muʿīn al-Dīn entered Damascus on 2 October. Shortly after, he received a belated order to detain al-Ṣāliḥ Ismāʿīl.

After its conquest, Muʿīn al-Dīn governed Damascus as al-Ṣāliḥ Ayyūb's viceroy (nāʾib al-salṭana). He distributed iqṭāʿs (lands) to the Khwārazmains, but they considered them insufficient. He appointed Shihāb al-Dīn Rashīd al-Kabīr as governor of the citadel (wālī al-qalʿa) and Jamāl al-Dīn Hārūn as governor of the holy places (wālī al-madīna). He also replaced al-Ṣāliḥ Ismāʿīl's qāḍī with one of his own men.

Al-Ṣāliḥ Ayyūb appointed Ḥusām al-Dīn ibn Abī ʿĀlī as governor of Damascus to replace Muʿīn al-Dīn, who died of typhoid in February 1246, shortly after Ḥusām al-Dīn's arrival.

== Bibliography ==
- Eddé, Anne-Marie (2002). "Wazīr, 3. The Ayyūbids". In Bearman, P. J.; Bianquis, Th.; Bosworth, C. E.; van Donzel, E. & Heinrichs, W. P. (eds.). The Encyclopaedia of Islam, Second Edition. Volume XI: W–Z. Leiden: E. J. Brill. pp. 190–191. ISBN 978-90-04-12756-2.
- Gottschalk, H. L. (1960). "Awlād al-Shaykh". In Gibb, H. A. R.; Kramers, J. H.; Lévi-Provençal, E.; Schacht, J.; Lewis, B. & Pellat, Ch. (eds.). The Encyclopaedia of Islam, Second Edition. Volume I: A–B. Leiden: E. J. Brill. pp. 765–766. OCLC 495469456.
- Humphreys, R. Stephen (1977). From Saladin to the Mongols: The Ayyubids of Damascus, 1193–1260. State University of New York Press.
