= Sixth Crusade =

1228–1229 attempted conquest of the Holy Land

- Part of the Crusades
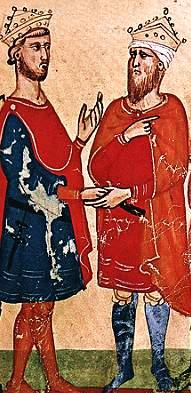
- Frederick II (left) meets al-Kamil (right)
| Date | 1227–1229 |
| Location | Near East |
| Result | Crusader victory: Treaty of Jaffa; Jerusalem given back to the Crusaders |
| Territorial changes | Jerusalem, Nazareth, Sidon, Jaffa and Bethlehem relinquished to Crusaders. |

Belligerents
| Holy Roman Empire; Teutonic Knights; Kingdom of Sicily | Ayyubids of Egypt; Ayyubids of Damascus |

Commanders and leaders
| Frederick II; Hermann of Salza; Thomas of Aquino; Peter des Roches; William Briwere; Henry of Limburg; Odo of Montbéliard; Richard Filangieri; Balian of Sidon; Pedro de Montaigu; Bertrand de Thessy | Al-Kamil; Fakhr ad-Din ibn as-Shaikh; An-Nasir Dā’ūd |

The Sixth Crusade (1228–1229), also known as the Crusade of Frederick II, was a military expedition to recapture Jerusalem and the rest of the Holy Land. It began seven years after the end of the Fifth Crusade and involved very little actual fighting. The diplomatic maneuvering of the Holy Roman emperor and king of Sicily, Frederick II, resulted in the Kingdom of Jerusalem regaining some control over Jerusalem for much of the ensuing fifteen years as well as over other areas of the Holy Land. Frederick II's negotiations and power-sharing agreement and negotiation with envoys from al-Malik Al-Kamil of Egypt, which led to a shared Christian-Muslim governance situation in Jerusalem, made this Crusade different from the others. Frederick II carried out his maneuvers in 1228 while under excommunication from the Church by Pope Gregory IX.

== Western Europe after the Fifth Crusade ==
The Fifth Crusade ended in 1221, having failed to gain any more influence in the Near East. Frederick II, Holy Roman emperor, never joined the campaign, despite his vow to do so. The forces he sent to Egypt arrived too late to make a difference in the debacle, partially due to the lack of effective leadership. They would have to wait for many more years for Frederick's actions. When Pope Innocent III died in 1216, his successor Honorius III did not immediately hold Frederick to his vow, but reminded him that the Christian world had waited for his action. However Gregory IX, the successor to Honorius, who became pope in March 1227, took a more hardline stance against the emperor. In Syria and Egypt, the Ayyubids were engaged in civil strife, in which the sultan al-Kamil fought against many of his brothers and other relatives. The sultan had yet to withdraw his offer of territory in exchange for peace that had been made during the Fifth Crusade, and Frederick would eventually accept this deal.

=== Frederick II and the Papacy ===
The failure of the Fifth Crusade was a devastating blow to Christendom. Of all the European sovereigns, only Emperor Frederick II was in a position to regain Jerusalem after the loss. Frederick was, like many of the 13th-century rulers, a serial crucesignatus. When he was formally crowned as King of Germany at Aachen on 15 July 1215, he astonished the crowd by taking the cross and calling upon the nobles present to do the same. Twenty years separated the crusader vows of Emperor Henry VI and his son Frederick and it is unclear whether the father's German Crusade of 1197 impacted the son's objectives for the Fifth Crusade.

The emperor again took the vow when he was re-crowned in Rome by the pope on 22 November 1220. At the same time, Frederick's oldest son, Henry, took the title of king of the Romans, and Frederick's wife, Constance of Aragon, was crowned empress. A year later, Honorius III reminded Frederick that he had not fulfilled his vow, and in December 1221, sent Nicola de Chiaromonte, cardinal-bishop of Tusculum, to confer with Frederick. They returned to Veroli in April 1222 to confer with the pontiff. A strategy meeting for the next Crusade did not happen until March 1223 at Ferentino and included the pope and emperor, plus John of Brienne, Latin patriarch Ralph of Mérencourt, the masters of the military orders, and many others. Frederick again vowed to go on Crusade in addition to signing an agreement with the errant Thomas of Celano, negotiated by Thomas of Aquino. But neither this nor the one signed two years later at San Germano assured Frederick's departure.

A new date was set for the expedition of 24 June 1225. At the same time, Frederick, widowed since June 1222, planned a strategic wedding. After the retreat of the Crusaders from Egypt in 1221, John of Brienne returned to Acre. He hoped to find a suitable husband for his daughter Isabella II of Jerusalem, then just 9 years of age. Leaving Odo of Montbéliard as bailli of the kingdom, he travelled to Italy, accompanied by Patriarch Ralph and Hospitaller master Guérin de Montaigu. In Apulia, he met with Frederick II and arranged for the marriage of Isabella II to the emperor. The pope gave his blessing, and it was John's understanding that he remain regent until 1226. When John left Italy, marrying Berengaria of León in 1224, he entrusted Hermann of Salza to conclude the arrangements for the wedding of his daughter.

Once again, preachers were sent throughout Europe to gain support for a new crusade, this time to be led by Frederick. Despite readying transport ships, the situation did not look good to meet the target date. Hermann of Salza and Ralph of Mérencourt were sent to the pope to apprise him of the situation. That would be one of the patriarch's last official acts, as he died in late 1224, succeeded by the bishop of Valence, Gérold of Lausanne. Honorius III sent cardinal bishop Conrad of Porto as papal legate to Germany, urging the clergy there to continue to pursue the crusade. The pope also urged Louis VIII of France to join Frederick, and to resolve his quarrel with Raymond VII of Toulouse. None of these efforts were fruitful and all were convinced that the timetable set at Ferentino was unachievable. The pope while at Rieti agreed to a delay on 18 July 1225, just days before the deadline and ten years after Frederick had originally committed to a crusade.

=== Agreement of San Germano ===
The Agreement of San Germano of 25 July 1225, signed at present day Cassino, was between Frederick II and Honorius III. A Dominican named Guala de Roniis was responsible for the negotiations. Frederick promised to depart on the Crusade by 15 August 1227 and remain for two years. During this period, he was to maintain 1000 knights in Syria, provide transport for additional forces, and provide Rome with 100,000 ounces in gold in the care of Hermann of Salza, John of Brienne and the patriarch. These funds would be returned to the emperor once he arrived at Acre. If, for any reason (including his death), he did not arrive, the money would be employed for the needs of the Holy Land. He also promised that if he went on Crusade that he would lead. After the agreement was signed, Guala became Bishop of Brescia. Based on the terms of the agreement, Frederick's forces ceased to occupy portions of the pontifical states. Moreover, all papal possessions in the Kingdom of Sicily were to be restored to the pope.

Frederick attested to the terms at the high altar with his hand on the Gospels. Apostolic legate Rainald of Urslingen, the duke of Spoleto, swore "on the soul of the emperor" that the agreement would be upheld under the pain of excommunication. In a letter to the pope, Frederick reiterated the terms and accepted the ban in the event the Crusade did not happen. He had committed himself beyond all retreat.

=== Situation in Italy ===
After agreeing with Honorius to launch a Crusade before 1228, Frederick summoned an imperial Diet at Cremona, the main pro-imperial city in Lombardy. The main arguments for holding the Diet would be to continue the struggle against heresy, to organize the crusade, and to restore the imperial power in northern Italy, long usurped by the numerous communes located there. Those assembled responded with the reformation of the Lombard League, which had already defeated the emperor Frederick I in the 12th century, and again Milan was chosen as the league's leader. The Diet was cancelled as well as the Truce of Constance. The situation was stabilized only through a compromise reached by Honorius between Frederick and the league. During his sojourn in northern Italy, Frederick also invested the Teutonic Knights with the territories in what would become East Prussia, starting what was later called the Northern Crusades.

=== King of Jerusalem ===
Frederick II desired to go to the Holy Land as king of Jerusalem. He married John of Brienne's daughter Isabella II by proxy in August 1225 at Acre, presided over by Giacomo, the bishop of Patti. In accordance with her father's wishes, she was crowned queen of Jerusalem a few days later at Tyre. Frederick sent fourteen galleys for her, under the command of admiral Henry of Malta, pardoned since his role at the disaster at Mansurah during the Fifth Crusade. They were formally married at Brindisi on 9 November 1227.

John and Frederick's relationship became frayed, as Frederick claimed the kingship of Jerusalem. John had allegedly been given assurances that he would be king of Jerusalem for the rest of his life. According to one version, John got into a disagreement with his new son-in-law because Frederick seduced a niece of Isabella who was her lady-in-waiting. In the other version of the chronicle, John often chastised his son-in-law, concluding that John wanted to seize Sicily for his nephew Walter IV of Brienne. Frederick declared that John had lost his claim to the kingdom when Isabella married him. He proclaimed himself king of Jerusalem for the first time in December 1225, taking the crown at a special ceremony at Foggia.

John of Brienne left for Rome, where Honorius sympathized with him, and ignored Frederick's claims. Balian of Sidon, Simon of Maugastel, the archbishop of Tyre, and the other Jerusalemite lords who had escorted Isabella to Brindisi acknowledged Frederick as their lawful king. Notably, these did not include the Ibelins. Nevertheless, the law––the Assizes of Jerusalem––required that the monarch be a resident of the kingdom. Frederick's first royal decree was to bestow new privileges upon Hermann of Salza and the Teutonic Knights, placing them on equal footing as the Templars and Hospitallers. Thomas of Aquino, the emperor's long-time advisor, replaced Odo of Montbéliard as bailli of the kingdom.

=== Financing the Crusade ===
In November 1222, John of Brienne arrived at Brindisi, the first king of Jerusalem to visit Europe, with multiple objectives. The treasury of the kingdom was depleted and additional funds were badly needed. He also wanted to ensure that future crusades were not hampered by the divided leadership shown in Egypt, and that the kingdom would lead such efforts. John's pleas for support at the courts of England and Spain were for naught, and the pledge he received from Philip II of France on his death-bed was from an account already allocated to the Holy Land. Henry III of England did eventually implement a levy but it is not clear that much was made from the voluntary contributions.

The conciliar decree Ad Liberandam published at the Fourth Lateran Council in 1215 formed a system of public financing of Crusades. The disbursements from the papal camera formed essential aid to the crusade movement, although the monies collected by individual crucesignati remained important. While some of these funds went directly to local Crusaders, by 1220, Innocent III had consolidated distribution. Frederick did not benefit from this, and from 1221 to 1228 there was limited ecclesiastical impost directed toward his planned Crusade. The funds for this imperial Sixth Crusade would have to be raised by the emperor. The gold sequestered after San Germano was quickly spent due to the delay of the crusade, and Frederick implemented a levy on Sicily beginning in 1228. He also gained financial support from Cyprus and as his new role as king of Jerusalem, but the lack of funds contributed to the small size of the Crusader army.

== Ayyubids after 1221 ==
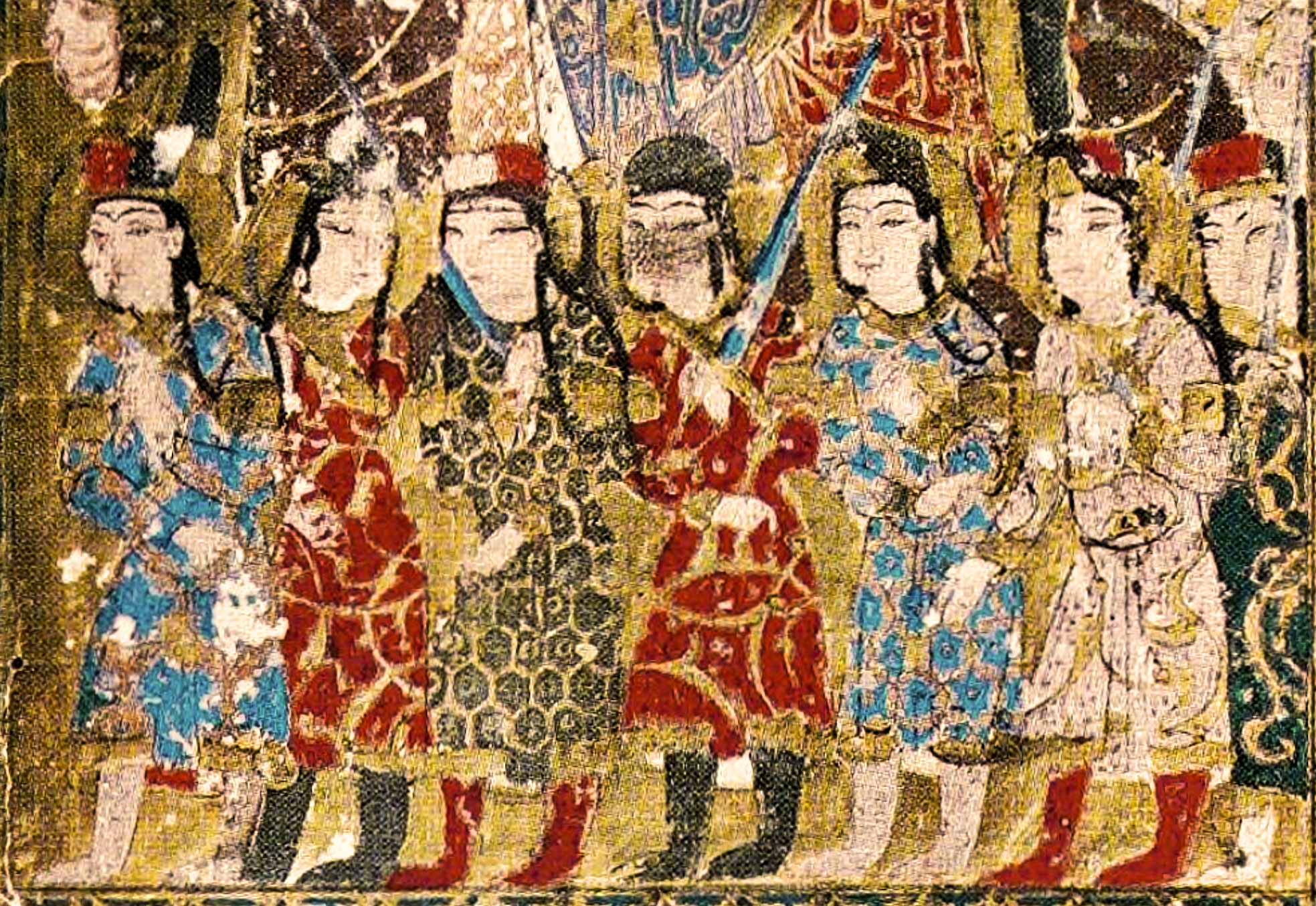
Zengid soldiers armed with long swords and wearing the aqbiya turkiyya coat, tiraz armbands, boots and sharbush hat, at the time of the atabegate of Badr al-Din Lu'lu' in 1218–1219. Kitab al-Aghani, Mosul.

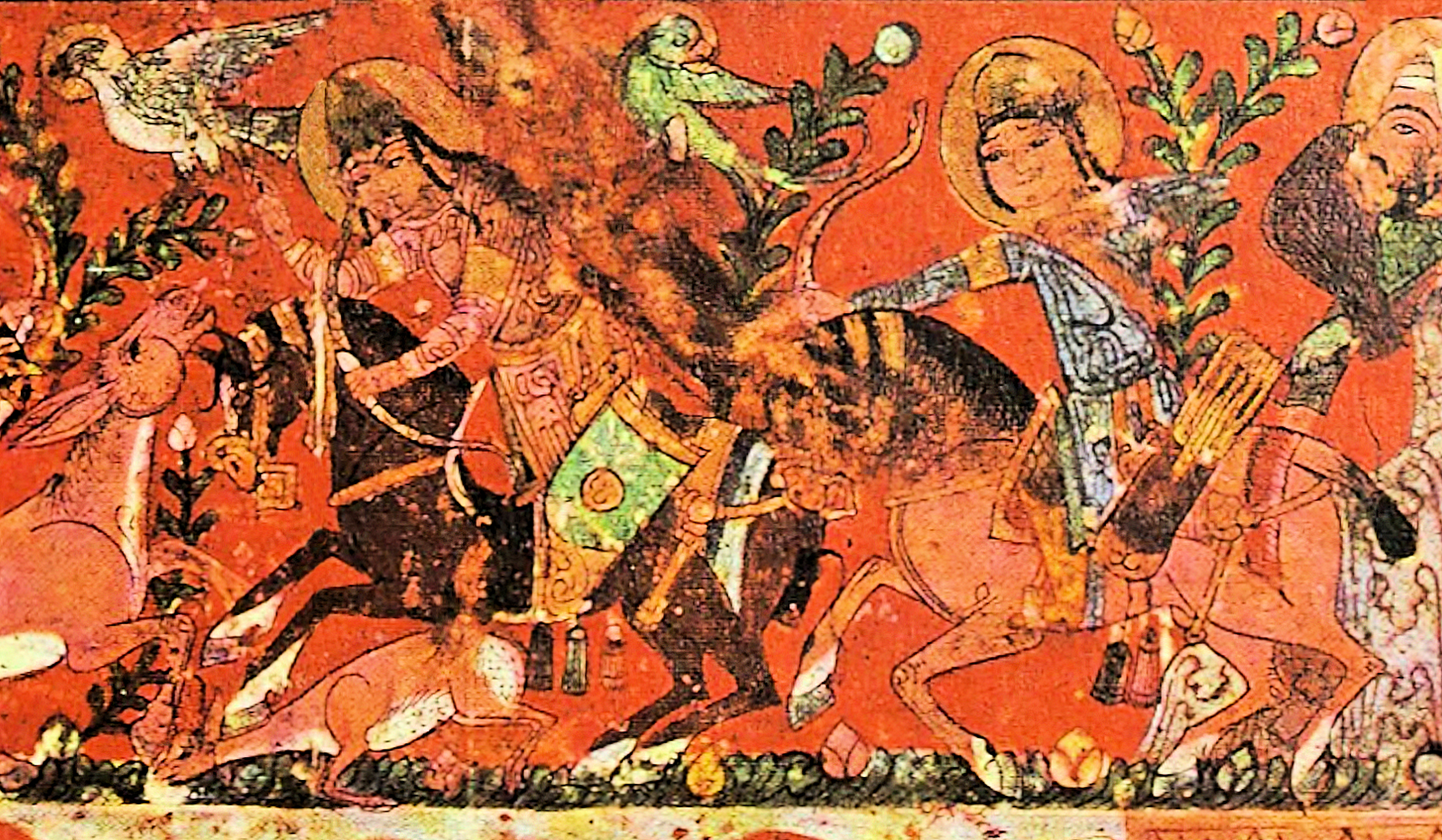
Zengid or Luluid horsemen, Jazira region, Kitāb al-Diryāq, 1225–1250.

The defeat of the Crusaders in the Fifth Crusade was a joint effort of the brothers al-Kamil, al-Mu'azzam and al-Ashraf. After 1221, al-Mu'azzam returned to Damascus, suspicious of his brothers and their motivations. In June 1222, he conducted an expedition against Guy I Embriaco to enforce the truce, and unsuccessfully attacked his cousin al-Nasir Kilij Arslan, emir of Hama, and later occupying Ma'arrat al-Numan and Salamiyah. Al-Mu'azzam was forced to halt his siege of Hama and to surrender his other conquests by order of al-Kamil. He then formed an alliance with Gökböri, a former general of Saladin's, possibly at the request of the sultan al-Nasir, against his brother al-Ashraf.

Another brother, al-Muzaffar Ghazi, had been installed at Mayyafariqin and Akhlat, losing Akhlat to al-Ashraf after revolting against him. Ghazi joined the rebellion of al-Mu'azzam's, which was quickly suppressed by al-Ashraf and the Alleppine forces. Again attacking at Homs, al-Mu'azzam was restrained by threats from al-Kamil. Now opposing both of his well-positioned brothers, al-Mu'azzam reached out to disaffected members of the sultan's Egyptian forces, challenging the sultan to come to Syria if he dared. Against al-Ashraf, he enlisted the aid of the Khwarazmians under the shah Jalal al-Din Mangburni to attack Diyar Bakr.

In 1226, al-Mu'azzam again moved on Homs, while Gökböri attacked Mosul and al-Jazira. Al-Ashraf stopped his brother at Homs and called on the Seljuk Sultan of Rûm, Kayqubad I, to help him with Gökböri. In the end, both al-Ashraf and Badr al-Din Lu'lu', ruler of Mosul, succumbed to al-Mu'azzam, but not before Jalal had invested himself in Akhlat and later Azerbaijan. His suzerainty over Akhlat was recognized by al-Mu'azzam, who also held al-Ashraf at Damascus. At this point, al-Kamil began exploring peace with the West, dispatching the emir Fakhr ad-Din ibn as-Shaikh to meet Frederick II (see below).

By May 1227, al-Kamil was concerned for his sultanate, feeling increasingly boxed in. The arrival of the Crusaders began, and he was again considering his offer of Jerusalem made to Frederick II in 1226, that appearing to him as the only viable option. However, by May 1227, al-Ashraf had been released from Damascus, and the emirs al-Nasir Kilij Arslan at Hama and al-Mujahid at Homs turned against al-Mu'azzam. Fearing the Crusaders gathering at Acre, al-Mu'azzam began, as he did in the Fifth Crusade, to dismantle the defences of his fortresses, including Jerusalem.

Al-Mu'azzam died on 12 November 1227, and was succeeded by his son an-Nasir Dā’ūd, with al-Kamil's approval. Peace among the Ayyubids did not last long. Dā’ūd refused his uncle's request to abandon Krak de Montreal. Then, yet another brother, al-Aziz Uthman of Banyas, attacked emir Bahram Shah of Baalbek. Ordered to stand down by Dā’ūd, al-Aziz persisted and al-Kamil responded by taking Jerusalem and Nablus in July 1228. Al-Ashraf was summoned to Damascus and he met al-Kamil at Tall al-Ajul. There it was decided that al-Ashraf would take Damascus, leaving Dā’ūd with al-Jazira. Al-Kamil remained in Jerusalem to conduct negotiations with Frederick II.

== Crusade begins ==
By 1226, it was clear that the Sixth Crusade would, in fact, happen with an invasion of Syria and Palestine with the objective of conquering Jerusalem. Frederick II was to lead the Crusade, essentially boxed in by the terms of San Germano. After the death of Honorius III in 1227, the new pope Gregory IX entered the curia with determination to proceed and a long-held dislike for Frederick.

=== Overview ===
The initial phase of the Crusade was a complex endeavour involving multiple deployments, negotiations with the Ayyubids, a delay of the departure of Frederick due to illness, a subsequent excommunication, and, finally, arrival of the emperor at Acre. The key points in the timeline are:

- August 1227: First wave departs Brindisi, arrives in Syria in October
- 1226–1227: Frederick's negotiations with al-Kamil
- September 1227: The second wave, including Frederick, departs and returns
- November 1227: Frederick is excommunicated by Gregory IX
- June 1228: Frederick finally sets sail.

After a five-week stopover in Cyprus, in September 1228, Frederick arrived at Acre.

=== German and Sicilian participation ===
The new role of Frederick also affected the objective of the Crusade. In 1224, the plans to invade Egypt required suitable ships able to enter the Nile delta. Now, the emphasis was a campaign to focus on Jerusalem, with men from Germany and finance from Sicily. Oliver of Paderborn, so effective in recruiting for the Fifth Crusade, participated in the recruitment and even joined the army gathering in Italy, but was not as successful. His diminished role was replaced by bishop Conrad of Hildesheim. The landgrave Louis of Thuringia took the cross in 1226 and with Walran of Limburg inspired hundreds of Thuringian and Austrian knights to join. They also drew significant support from Cologne, Lübeck and Worms. Many prelates and ministeriales also joined, including the poet Freidank. The numbers and prowess of the German crusades provided hope to the expedition planners.

=== English participation ===
Henry III of England took the cross upon his coronation in May 1220 and had planned a crusade after Louis IX of France's failures. In 1223, Honorius III appealed to Henry to assist in the Holy Land. But, like his father John Lackland before him, crises closer to home took precedence. Nevertheless, there was to be significant English participation in the Sixth Crusade.

William Briwere, the bishop of Exeter, participated in the Crusade as a proxy for his uncle William Brewer, who died before he was able to fulfill his crusading vows. Brewer had taken the cross in 1189, but was excused because of administrative duties. Briwere went on the Crusade with Peter des Roches, bishop of Winchester. An army of other Crusaders accompanied them to the Holy Land, although whether they were English or mercenaries recruited on the Continent is unclear. The contingent left from Brindisi in August 1227.

The bishops were influential advisors to Frederick II. As the pope had ordered that no one collaborate with the excommunicate Frederick, both bishops ignored the papal orders and worked closely with Frederick. The financial resources both bishops brought were especially appreciated by the crusaders. The fortifications of Caesarea and Jaffa were implemented with their money. Both witnessed the treaty signing in February 1229 with al-Kamil.

=== Negotiations between the emperor and the sultan ===
As described above, the sultan al-Kamil was in a desperate civil conflict in 1226. Having unsuccessfully tried negotiations with the West beginning in 1219, he again tried this approach. The sultan sent the emir Fakhr ad-Din ibn as-Shaikh to Frederick asking him to come to Acre for discussions, offering return of much of the Holy Land to Christian control in exchange for military support against his brother al-Mu'azzam at Damascus. Fakhr ad-Din reportedly was somewhat amazed when he reached Palermo and discovered that Frederick spoke Arabic, had admiration for Muslim society and contempt for Rome.

Frederick responded by sending his bailli and trusted advisor Thomas of Aquino and Berardus de Castacca, archbishop of Palermo, to meet with al-Kamil. Other than an exchange of gifts, nothing was accomplished. The bishop is reported to have continued on the Damascus to negotiate with al-Mu'azzam who, rejecting the overture, attempted to make peace with the younger Ayyubid brother al-Ashraf. The negotiations would continue in the autumn of 1227, after Frederick's excommunication, as described below.

=== Crusaders depart ===
The port of Brindisi was designated as the departure point and by mid-summer 1227, large numbers of Crusaders had arrived. The crowded conditions and high heat contributed to general discontent and disease among the assembled troops. Many returned home, leaving some transports unused. Others died, including Siegfried von Rechberg, the bishop of Augsburg.

The first contingents of Crusaders sailed August 1227 and arrived in Syria early October. They included Germans under the command of Thomas of Aquino and Henry of Limburg, and French and English under the command of the bishops Peter des Roches and William Briwere. Arriving at Acre, they joined with forces of the kingdom and fortified the coastal towns of Caesarea and Jaffa. They forced the Muslims of Damascus out of Sidon and fortified the island of Qal'at al-Bahr. The Germans rebuilt Montfort Castle, northeast of Acre, for the Teutonic Knights.

The emperor and his contingent were delayed while their ships were refitted. They sailed on 8 September 1227, but before they reached their first stop of Otranto many, including Frederick, were struck with the plague. Louis of Thuringia had, in fact, died. Frederick disembarked to secure medical attention. Resolved to keep his oath, he sent a fleet of twenty galleys on to Acre. This included Hermann of Salza, Gérold of Lausanne, Odo of Montbéliard and Balian of Sidon. The Crusade was now under the command of Henry IV, Duke of Limburg.

In February or March 1228, al-Aziz Uthman of Banyas ambushed a group of crusaders near Tyre, killing or capturing some seventy horsemen.

=== Frederick's excommunication ===
Frederick II sent his emissaries to inform Gregory IX of the situation. These included Rainald of Spoleto, Nicolò dei Maltraversi, Lando of Anagni, the archbishop of Reggio, and Marino Filangieri, the archbishop of Bari, but the pope refused to meet with them, and would not listen to Frederick's side of the story. Frederick II, the Holy Roman Emperor, was excommunicated on 29 September 1227.

The pope did not know, or care, about Frederick's illness, just that he had not lived up to his agreement. His letter to the emperor of 10 October 1227 laying out conditions for his rehabilitation referred less to the crusade than to infractions in Sicily. In his circular letter announcing the excommunication, Frederick was branded a wanton violator of his sacred oath taken many times, at Aachen, Veroli, Ferentino, and San Germano, and was held responsible for the deaths of Crusaders at Brindisi. He was accused of feigning his illness, relaxing at Pozzuoli, rather than in the Holy Land. Frederick's response was more factual, and included an appeal for more to take the cross.

In November 1227, the sultan's emissary Fakhr ad-Din ibn as-Shaikh was again sent to meet with the emperor. It is here that it is believed the Fakhr ad-Din was knighted by Frederick, as described by Jean de Joinville, chronicler of the Seventh Crusade. The negotiations were conducted in secret, causing concern among the German Crusaders. Even the amiable poet Freidank, positively disposed towards the emperor, expressed his sorrow. Shortly after Fakhr ad-Din had departed, the emperor's negotiator Thomas of Aquino sent word that al-Mu'azzam had suddenly died on 12 November 1227. This revelation changed the balance of power, and Frederick dispatched Richard Filangieri, marshal of the Kingdom of Sicily, to Syria with 500 knights to augment to force already there as he prepared for a departure in the spring of 1228.

== The Sixth Crusade ==
Frederick made his last effort to be reconciled with Gregory, sending Albert I of Käfernburg, the archbishop of Magdeburg, and two Sicilian justiciars to speak with the pope. It had no effect and Frederick sailed from Brindisi on 28 June 1228. The fleet was under the command of admiral Henry of Malta, and clergymen Berardus de Castacca, Nicolò dei Maltraversi, Marino Filangieri, and Giacomo of Patti, now archbishop of Capua, accompanied him. He had only a small force with him, since the main force had sailed in August 1227 and reinforcements in April 1228. Guérin de Montaigu, master of the Hospitallers who had helped convince the pope to break the truce with the Muslims, refused to accompany Frederick as an excommunicate. He was replaced by Bertrand de Thessy, who embarked with the emperor.

=== Stopover in Cyprus ===
The route of Frederick's fleet can be traced day-by-day. On 29 June 1228 it stopped in Otranto, whence it crossed the Adriatic Sea to the island of Othonoi on 30 June. It was in Corfu on 1 July, Porto Guiscardo in Cephalonia on 2 July, Methoni on 4 July, Portocaglie near Cape Matapan on 5 July, Cerigo on 6 July and it reached Souda Bay on Crete on 7 July. The fleet moved slowly along the Cretan coast, pausing for a whole day at Heraklion before crossing the Aegean Sea to Rhodes during 12–15 July. They sailed along the Anatolian coast to Phenika, where they stayed on 16–17 July replenishing their water supplies. The fleet then crossed the sea to Cyprus, arriving at Limassol on 21 July.

The Kingdom of Cyprus had been an imperial fief since the emperor Henry VI, Frederick's father, had accepted the homage of Aimery of Lusignan and made him king on the eve of the German Crusade in 1196. Hugh I of Cyprus had ruled the island kingdom since the death of his father Aimery in 1205. Upon his death, his wife Alice of Champagne became regent of the young king Henry I of Cyprus. Alice was the aunt of the empress Isabella II and had attended her coronation in Tyre. In the meantime, John of Ibelin, the Old Lord of Beirut, had been appointed regent without the knowledge of either Alice or Frederick.

The emperor arrived with the clear intent of stamping his authority on the kingdom and was treated cordially by the local barons. Frederick claimed that the regency of John of Ibelin was illegitimate and demanded the surrender of John's mainland fief of Beirut to the imperial throne. Here he erred, for John pointed out that the kingdoms of Cyprus and Jerusalem were constitutionally separate and he could not be punished for offences in Cyprus by seizure of Beirut. This would have important consequences for the crusade, as it alienated the powerful Ibelin faction, turning them against the emperor.

Frederick sailed to Acre from Famagusta on 3 September 1228. He was accompanied by the king Henry I of Cyprus, John of Ibelin, and many Cypriote nobles. He left the Cypriote baron Amalric Barlais as bailli of Cyprus, supported by Gavin of Chenichy.

=== In the Kingdom of Jerusalem ===
Frederick II arrived in Acre on 7 September 1228 and was received warmly by the Templars, Hospitallers and clergy, but denied the kiss of peace due to his excommunication. He yielded to pressure and made overtures to the pope, sending Henry of Malta and archbishop Marino Filangieri to announce his arrival in Syria and to request absolution. Rainald of Spoleto was named Frederick's regent in Sicily authorized to negotiate with Rome. But Gregory IX had already made up his mind, sending word to the Latin patriarch and masters of the military orders that the emperor's ban still held, despite his arrival.

When Frederick and his companions arrived at Acre, John of Ibelin went immediately to Beirut to ensure that the city could withstand an imperial attack, returning to face the Haute Cour. Frederick did not immediately take action as Acre was split in its support for Frederick. Frederick's own army and the Teutonic Knights supported him, but the Templars, the patriarch and the Syrian clergy followed the hostile papal line. The Pisans and Genoese supported the emperor and the English vacillated, first for Frederick, shifting to the pope, then back. He gave nominal commands to faithful adherents—Hermann of Salza, Odo of Montbéliard, Richard Filangieri—in order for Crusaders to avoid jeopardizing their positions in the eyes of the curia. Once news of Frederick's excommunication had spread, public support for him waned considerably. The position of the Hospitallers and Templars was more complicated. They refused to join the emperor's army directly, but they supported the Crusade once Frederick agreed to have his name removed from official orders. The Outremer barons greeted Frederick enthusiastically at first, but were wary of the emperor's history of centralization and his desire to impose imperial authority. This was largely due to Frederick's treatment of John of Ibelin in Cyprus, and his apparent disdain for their constitutional concerns.

Frederick's army was not large. Of the troops he had sent under duke Henry of Limburg in 1227 had mostly returned home out of impatience or of fear of offending the Church. The few who had sailed East under the patriarch Gérold of Lausanne remained as did the knights under Richard Filangieri. Even augmented with the forces available in Outremer, he could not muster an effective army capable of striking a decisive blow on the Muslims. Further, he got word that his regent Rainald of Spoleto had failed in his attack on the March of Ancona and that Gregory IX was planning to invade his own kingdom. He could neither afford nor mount a lengthening campaign in the Holy Land. The Sixth Crusade would be one of negotiation.

=== Treaty of Jaffa ===
After resolving the internecine struggles in Syria, al-Kamil's position was stronger than it was a year before when he made his original offer to Frederick. He likely did not know that Frederick's force was a mere shadow of the army that had amassed when the Crusade had originally been called. Frederick realised that his only hope of success in the Holy Land was to negotiate for the return of Jerusalem as he lacked the manpower to engage in battle. He sent Thomas of Aquino and Balian of Sidon to inform the sultan of his arrival in the Holy Land. Al-Kamil was friendly but non-committal. In reply, Frederick received the ambassadors of the sultan, including Fakhr ad-Din ibn as-Shaikh, at the Hospitaller camp at Recordane, near Acre. The sultan relocated from Nablus to Hiribya, northeast of Gaza, and Thomas and Balian were sent to resume negotiations.

Frederick hoped that a token show of force, a threatening march down the coast, would be enough to convince al-Kamil to honor a proposed agreement that had been negotiated some years earlier. The masters of the Templars and Hospitallers, Pedro de Montaigu and Bertrand de Thessy, accompanied the emperor, at a distance behind as he was excommunicate. In January 1229, Frederick received notice that John of Brienne, serving the curia as rector of a Patrimony of Saint Peter, had taken San Germano and was threatening Capua. This placed Frederick in an awkward position. If he delayed in the Holy Land too long, he could lose his empire. If he left without results, he would be dishonored. He directed Henry of Malta to send twenty galleys to Syria by the following Easter. Fortunately, al-Kamil was occupied with a siege in Damascus against his nephew an-Nasir Dā’ūd. He then agreed to cede Jerusalem to the Franks, along with a narrow corridor to the coast.

The treaty was concluded on 18 February 1229, and also involved a ten-year truce. The English bishops Peter des Roches and William Briwere were witness to the signing. No complete copy of the treaty has survived, either in Latin nor Arabic. In it, al-Kamil surrendered Jerusalem with the exception of some Muslim holy sites. Frederick also received Bethlehem and Nazareth, part of Sidon district, and Jaffa and Toron, dominating the coast. Other lordships may have been returned to Christian control, but sources disagree. It was, however, a treaty of compromise. The Muslims retained control over the Temple Mount area of Jerusalem, the Jami Al-Aqsa, and the Dome of the Rock. The Transjordan castles stayed in Ayyubid hands. Whether Frederick was permitted to restore Jerusalem's fortifications was unclear, although the Crusaders did in fact restore Jerusalem's defensive walls.

The agreement, known sometimes as the Treaty of Jaffa, also included the agreement signed by the different Ayyubid rulers at Tell Ajul near Gaza, of which, from al-Kamil's perspective, the treaty with Frederick was just an extension, which allows this agreement to be also called the Treaty of Jaffa and Tell Ajul. Frederick seems to have pledged his support to the sultan against all enemies, including Christian ones. The other Crusader states—Principality of Antioch and County of Tripoli—would receive no support in the event of war with the Muslims. The strongholds of the Hospitallers and Templars were left in statu quo, and aid was not to be provided from any source. Prisoners from this conflict and the previous crusade were to be released. The provisions for the military orders and the possessions of Bohemond IV of Antioch likely reflect their lack of support provided to Frederick.

=== In Jerusalem ===
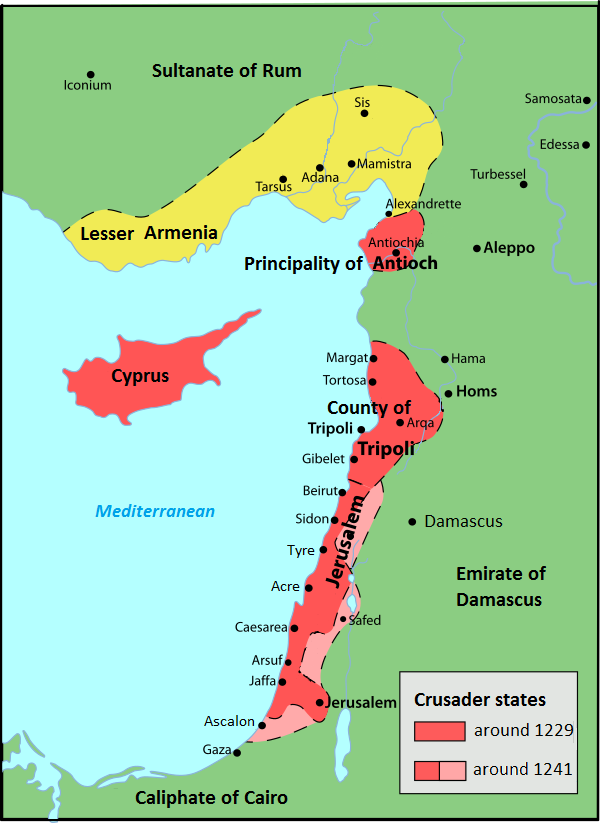
The Kingdom of Jerusalem after the Sixth Crusade

The patriarch and the masters of the military orders—Gérold of Lausanne, Pedro de Montaigu and Bertrand de Thessy—all felt betrayed by the treaty and its concessions making the protection of the Holy city near-impossible. Hermann of Salza approached Gérold with a proposal of reconciliation, but the patriarch saw only deceit, trying to prevent Frederick's entry into Jerusalem by threatening excommunication of the army and placing the city under interdict. He sent archbishop Peter of Caesarea to meet the army, but he was too late.

Frederick entered Jerusalem on 17 March 1229 and received the formal surrender of the city by al-Kamil's agent. He went to the Church of the Holy Sepulchre the next day and placed the crown on his own head. Hermann of Salza read the emperor's statement, blaming his excommunication not on the pope, but his advisors. It is unknown whether he intended this to be interpreted as his official coronation as King of Jerusalem; the absence of the patriarch rendered it questionable. There is evidence to suggest that the crown Frederick wore was actually the imperial one, but in any case proclaiming his lordship over Jerusalem was a provocative act. Legally, he was actually only regent for his son with Isabella, Conrad II of Jerusalem, who had been born shortly before Frederick left in 1228. Conrad's maternal grandparents were Maria of Montferrat and John of Brienne.

Still wearing his crown, Frederick proceeded to the palace of the Hospitallers where he met with the English bishops and members of the military orders to discuss the fortifications of the city. Not until the morning of 19 March 1229 did Peter of Caesarea arrive to enforce the interdict, which he wisely chose not to do. At any rate, Frederick's interest in Jerusalem was waning, as he was planning to immediately leave. While Frederick was on his way to the harbour he was pelted with dung and entrails by the unappreciative people of Acre. Odo of Montbéliard and John of Ibelin quelled the unrest.

On 1 May 1229, Frederick departed from Acre, landing at Cyprus to attend the wedding by proxy of Henry I of Cyprus to Alice of Montferrat, with the bride later transported to Cyprus by the emperor's supporters. He arrived at Brindisi on 10 June 1229, and it was a month before the pope was aware that he had left the Holy Land. By the autumn, he had regained full possession of his empire. Frederick obtained from the pope relief from his excommunication on 28 August 1230 with the Treaty of San Germano, and he returned to the Hospitallers and the Templars the goods confiscated in Sicily.

== Legacy ==
The results of the Sixth Crusade were not universally acclaimed. Two letters from the Christian side tell differing stories. In his correspondence to Henry III of England, Frederick touts the great success of the endeavour. In contrast, the letter to the "all the faithful" by the patriarch Gérold of Lausanne paints a darker picture of the emperor and his accomplishments. On the Muslim side, al-Kamil himself was pleased with the accord, but Arabic sources referred to the treaty as "one of the most disastrous events of Islam," laying the blame solely with the sultan. The Muslim historians expressed equal disdain for the sultan and the Holy Roman Emperor.

The ten-year expiration of Frederick's treaty with al-Kamil caused Pope Gregory IX to call for a new crusade to secure the Holy Lands for Christendom beyond 1239. This initiated the Barons' Crusade, a disorganized affair which wound up with relatively limited support from both Frederick and the pope, but which nevertheless regained more land than even the Sixth Crusade.

Frederick had set a precedent, in having achieved success on crusade without papal involvement. He achieved success without fighting since he lacked manpower to engage Ayyubids. This was due to the engagement of Ayyubids with the rebellion in Syria. Further crusades would be launched by individual kings, such as Theobald I of Navarre (the Barons' Crusade), Louis IX of France (the Seventh and Eighth Crusades), and Edward I of England (the Ninth Crusade), effectively demonstrating an erosion of papal authority.

In the Ayyubid camp, the treaty allowed the sultan al-Kamil and his brother al-Ashraf to focus their energies into defeating their nephew an-Nasir Dā’ūd, emir of Damascus, capturing his capital city in June 1229. An-Nasir, was left subordinate to al-Kamil and in possession of Kerak.

== Participants ==
A partial list of those that participated in the Sixth Crusade can be found in the category collections of Christians of the Sixth Crusade and Muslims of the Sixth Crusade.

== Primary sources ==
The historiography of the Sixth Crusade is concerned with the "history of the histories" of the military campaigns discussed herein as well as biographies of the important figures of the period. The primary sources include works written in the medieval period, generally by participants in the Crusade or written contemporaneously with the event. The primary Western sources of the Sixth Crusade include several eyewitness accounts, and are as follows.

- Estoire d’Eracles émperor (History of Heraclius) is an anonymous history of Jerusalem down to 1277, a continuation of William of Tyre's work and drawing from both Ernoul and the Rothelin Continuation.
- Historia Orientalis (Historia Hierosolymitana) and Epistolae, by theologian and historian Jacques de Vitry.
- Flores Historiarum, by English chronicler Roger of Wendover, covering the period from 1188 up to 1235.
- Grand chronique, by English chronicler Matthew Paris.
- Gestes des Chiprois (Deeds of the Cypriots), by several authors including Philip of Novara. Includes The wars of Frederick II against the Ibelins in Syria and Cyprus.
- Historia diplomatica Frederici secundi, a history of the diplomacy of Frederick II, by French archivist and historian Jean L. Huillard-Bréholles.
- Ryccardi di Sancto Germano Notarii Chronicon, by Richard of San Germano.

The Arabic sources of the Crusade include the following.

- Complete Work of History, particularly Part 3: The Years 589–629/1193–1231. The Ayyubids after Saladin and the Mongol Menace, by Ali ibn al-Athir, an Arab or Kurdish historian.
- Kitāb al-rawḍatayn (The Book of the Two Gardens) and its sequel al-Dhayl ʿalā l-rawḍatayn, by Arab historian Abū Shāma.
- Tarikh al-Mukhtasar fi Akhbar al-Bashar (History of Abu al-Fida), by Kurdish historian Abu’l-Fida.
- History of Egypt, by Egyptian historian Al-Makrizi.
- The Necklace of Pearls (Perles d’Historie), by Arab Islamic scholar Badr al-Din al-Ayni.
- History of the Patriarchs of Alexandria, begun in the 10th century, and continued into the 13th century.

Many of these primary sources can be found in Crusade Texts in Translation. German historian Reinhold Röhricht also compiled two collections of works concerning the Sixth Crusade: Beiträge zur Geschichte der Kreuzzüg (1888), Geschichte der Kreuzzüge im Umriss (1898), and Die Kreuzfahrt Kaiser Friedrich des Zweiten (1228–1229) (1872). He also collaborated on the work Annales de Terre Sainte that provides a chronology of the Crusade correlated with the original sources.

== Bibliography ==
- Abulafia, David (1992). Frederick II: A Medieval Emperor. Oxford University Press. ISBN 019508040-8.
- Abu-Munshar, Maher Y. (2013). Sultan al-Kamil, Emperor Frederick II and the Submission of Jerusalem. International Journal of Social Science and Humanity 3:5 pp. 443–447.
- Archer, Thomas Andrew (1904). The Crusades: The Story of the Latin Kingdom of Jerusalem. Putnam.
- Arnold, Benjamin (2000). "Emperor Frederick II (1194–1250) and the political particularism of the German princes". Journal of Medieval History. 26 (3). Journal of Medieval History, Volume 26, Issue 3, pp. 239–252: 239–252. doi:10.1016/S0304-4181(00)00005-1. S2CID 153620192.
- Asbridge, Thomas (2012). The Crusades: The War for the Holy Land. Simon & Schuster. ISBN 978-1-84983-688-3.
- Barker, Ernest (1923). The Crusades. World's manuals. Oxford University Press, London.
- Boas, Adrian J. (2001). Jerusalem in the Time of the Crusades. Routledge. ISBN 9780415230001.
- Cahen, Claude (1968). Pre-Ottoman Turkey. Taplinger Publishing Company. ISBN 978-1597404563.
- Cazel, Fred A. Jr. (1969). Financing the Crusades (PDF). A History of the Crusades (Setton), Volume VI. Archived from the original (PDF) on 2023-03-26.
- Christie, Niall (2014). Muslims and Crusaders: Christianity's Wars in the Middle East, 1095–1382, from the Islamic Sources. Routledge. ISBN 978-1138543102.
- Delaville Le Roulx, Joseph (1904). Les Hospitaliers en Terre Sainte et à Chypre (1100–1310). E. Leroux, Paris.
- Edbury, Peter W. (1997). John of Ibelin and the Kingdom of Jerusalem. Boydell Press. ISBN 978-0851157030.
- Fulton, Michael S. (2018). Artillery in the Era of the Crusades. Brill Publications. ISBN 9789004349452.
- Furber, Elizabeth Chapin (1969). The Kingdom of Cyprus, 1191–1291 (PDF). A History of the Crusades (Setton), Volume II. Archived from the original (PDF) on 2023-03-26.
- Gibb, H. A. R. (1969). The Aiyūbids (PDF). A History of the Crusades (Setton), Volume II. Archived from the original (PDF) on 2023-03-26.
- Giles, Keith R. (1987). "The Emperor Frederick II's Crusade, 1215 – c. 1231" (PDF). Asian Journal of Pharmaceutical Sciences. 5 (4). Ph.D Dissertation, Keele University.
- Hardwicke, Mary Nickerson (1969). The Crusader States, 1192–1243 (PDF). A History of the Crusades (Setton), Volume II. Archived from the original (PDF) on 2024-03-28.
- Humphreys, R. Stephen (1977). From Saladin to the Mongols: The Ayyubids of Damascus, 1193–1260. State University of New York. ISBN 978-0873952637.
- Lane-Poole, Stanley (1894). The Mohammedan dynasties: chronological and genealogical tables with historical introductions. A. Constable & Co., Westminster.
- Lane-Poole, Stanley (1901). History of Egypt in the Middle Ages. A History of Egypt v. 6. Methuen, London. ISBN 9780790532042.
- Lock, Peter (2006). The Routledge Companion to the Crusades. Routledge. doi:10.4324/9780203389638. ISBN 0-415-39312-4.
- Maalouf, Amin (2006). The Crusades through Arab Eyes. Saqi Books. ISBN 9780863560231.
- Madden, Thomas F. (2013). The Concise History of the Crusades. Rowman & Littlefield. ISBN 978-1-442-21576-4.
- Maier, Christoph T. (1998). Preaching the Crusades: Mendicant Friars and the Cross in the Thirteenth Century. Cambridge University Press. ISBN 0-521-45246-5.
- Miller, Duane A. (2017). Sixth Crusade. War and Religion, Volume 3, pp. 754–755.
- Munro, Dana Carleton (1902). Letters of the Crusaders. Translations and reprints from the original sources of European history. University of Pennsylvania.
- Murray, Alan V. (2006). The Crusades – An Encyclopedia. ABC-CLIO. ISBN 978-1-57607-862-4.
- Mylod, M. J. (2017). The Fifth Crusade in Context: The Crusading Movement in the Early Thirteenth Century. Routledge. doi:10.4324/9781315574059. ISBN 9780367880354.
- Perry, Guy (2013). John of Brienne: King of Jerusalem, Emperor of Constantinople, c. 1175–1237. Cambridge University Press. ISBN 9781107043107.
- Richard, Jean C. (1999). The Crusades, c. 1071 – c. 1291. Cambridge University Press. ISBN 978-0-521-62566-1.
- Röhricht, Reinhold (1884). Annales de Terre Sainte, 1095–1291. E. Leroux, Paris.
- Runciman, Steven (1954). A History of the Crusades, Volume Three: The Kingdom of Acre and the Later Crusades. Cambridge University Press. ISBN 978-0521347723.
- Setton, Kenneth M. (1969). A History of the Crusades. Six Volumes. University of Wisconsin Press.
- Stürner, Wolfgang (2009). Friedrich II. 1194–1250. Primus-Verlag, Germany. ISBN 978-3-534-23040-2.
- Tyerman, Christopher (1996). England and the Crusades, 1095–1588. University of Chicago Press. ISBN 0-226-82012-2.
- Tyerman, Christopher (2006). God's War: A New History of the Crusades. Belknap Press. ISBN 978-0-674-02387-1.
- Van Cleve, Thomas C. (1969). The Crusade of Frederick II (PDF). A History of the Crusades (Setton), Volume II. Archived from the original (PDF) on 26 January 2023.
- Van Cleve, Thomas C. (1972). The Emperor Frederick II of Hohenstaufen, Immutator Mundi. Clarendon Press, London. ISBN 019822513X.
- Weiler, Björn K. U. (2006a). Frederick II of Germany. The Crusades – An Encyclopedia. pp. 475–477.
- Weiler, Björn K. U. (2006b). Crusade of Emperor Frederick II (1227–1229). The Crusades – An Encyclopedia, pp. 313–315.
- Whalen, Brett Edward (2019). The Two Powers: The Papacy, the Empire, and the Struggle for Sovereignty in the Thirteenth Century. University of Pennsylvania Press. ISBN 978-0812250862.
- Wolff, Robert Lee (1969). The Latin Empire of Constantinople, 1204–1312 (PDF). A History of the Crusades (Setton), Volume II. Archived from the original (PDF) on 2023-03-26.
