= Hugo von Trimberg =

German poet & writer (c. 1230–1313 )

A page from Der Renner in Codex Bodmer 91

Hugo von Trimberg (born circa 1230/1235 in Wern(a), now either Ober- or Niederwerrn near Schweinfurt – died after 1313 in Bamberg-Theuerstadt) was a German didactic author of the Middle Ages.

Around 1260 he came to the religious foundation of St. Gangolf in the Bamberg suburb of Theuerstadt, where surviving documents mention him as a teacher . He later became Rector, which he remained until 1309. Unusually for the role of rector, von Trimberg was married with wife and children. He was noted in his own day, and is now remembered for his didactic writing, much of which was primarily aimed at his own students.

== Works ==
Hugo composed, by his own account, five works in Latin and seven in German, of which there survive only three and one respectively (a second German work, now lost, was entitled Der Sammler (The Collector):

- Registrum multorum auctorum: a Latin verse summary of 100 school Latin authors, with summaries of their lives and works
- Laurea sanctorum: a Latin poem on the saints of the calendar and their feast days
- Solsequium: also in Latin, this work was intended not for schoolboys but for preachers, and consists of 166 "exempla", or anecdotes, intended to be used as illustrations in sermons
- Der Renner: the epic poem Der Renner ("The Runner" or "The Courier", so called because the author intended that it should run the length and breadth of Germany), comprising 24,600 verses, is the most comprehensive didactic poem in the German language. It has been transmitted in several manuscripts and many revisions, most of them by Hugo himself: although the poem first appeared in c1300, he continued to work on it until his death. The allegorical framework holding the encyclopaedic content together is based on the Seven Deadly Sins and contains much social comment, most of it critical of the burgher, noble and clerical estates. In 1549 Cyriakus Jakob von Bock printed in Frankfurt am Main a Reformist revision.
