= Thomas I of Aquino =

Count of Acerra

Thomas I of Aquino (before 1210 – 27 February 1251), usually known as Thomas of Aquino, was Count of Acerra from 1220 and a follower of Holy Roman Emperor and King of Sicily, Frederick II. The son of Adenolfo d'Aquino, Thomas belonged to the noble d'Aquino family which included the famous theologian Saint Thomas Aquinas.

== Early life ==
Thomas was a supporter of the young Frederick as King of Germany and fought against the emperor Otto IV, who invaded southern Italy in 1210. He was appointed Count of Acerra after Frederick's imperial coronation in 1220 at the same time that his cousin Landulf von Aquino, the father of the church scholar Thomas, was appointed legal advisor at Terra di Lavoro. In Capua, Thomas was entrusted with fighting the rebellious Thomas of Celano, Count of Molise, and the taking of Roccamandolfi. In January 1221 he was appointed the emperor's deputy in Apulia and Terra di Lavoro.

In his new offices, Thomas immediately came into conflict with Honorius III when, in accordance with a strict implementation of the resolutions of Capua, which provided for a revocation of privileges, he demanded fees and charges for the imperial treasury from the city of Benevento. Benevento was a papal enclave in the Kingdom of Sicily, but Frederick II did not renew one of the city's privileges, legitimizing Thomas' approach. Feelings of revenge may also have played a role, as Thomas was once imprisoned in Benevento in 1213. In May 1221, Honorius III became personally involved in this matter and successfully urged the emperor to respect Benevento's status as papal property.

In 1225, Frederick married Isabella II of Jerusalem, heiress to the Kingdom of Jerusalem. Frederick immediately saw to it that his new father-in-law John of Brienne, the current king of Jerusalem, was dispossessed and his rights transferred to the emperor. In particular, Odo of Montbéliard, the bailli of the kingdom, was replaced by Thomas in 1227.

== Sixth Crusade ==
In July 1227, Thomas and Hermann of Salza, master of the Teutonic Knights, led an advance command of the Sixth Crusade to the Holy Land. There he served as an envoy to the Egyptian sultan al-Kamil, informing him of the emperor's imminent arrival. In the spring of 1228 he wrote a letter to the imperial court in which he reported on the death of al-Mu'azzam, al-Kamil's brother who ruled Damascus, which prompted the recently excommunicated Frederick to begin his crusade. In July 1228, Thomas rejoined the imperial entourage in Limassol and took part in the persecution of John of Ibelin. Together with Balian of Sidon, he continued as a mediator with al-Kamil, visiting him in Nablus and Gaza. Thomas developed a relationship of trust with the sultan as did the sultan's own diplomat Fakhr ad-Din ibn as-Shaikh with the emperor. This resulted in a mutual agreement between the emperor and the sultan that on 18 February 1229 returned most of Jerusalem to Christianity without war. Through his mediation work, Thomas was also able to get al-Ashraf Musa, al-Kamil's brother and emir of Damascus, to sign the treaty.

== After the Crusade ==
After returning to Italy in August 1229, Thomas was entrusted with the submission of Capua, taken by papal troops during the absence of Frederick. He was replaced as bailli by Richard Filangieri in Tyre and Odo of Montbéliard in Acre. In Melfi in 1231, he was appointed Capitaneus regni (regent) of the Kingdom of Sicily during absence of the emperor in northern Italy. He followed him there himself in 1233, where he took over the rectorate of Cremona with the consent of the local population. When the emperor set out for Germany a second time in 1235, Thomas was accepted into the Regency Council in Fano.

In 1242, Thomas was sent a second time to the Holy Land to act there as deputy to the emperor and from April 1243 for Conrad II of Jerusalem in his role as regent. In doing so, he faced opposition from the same local barons under the leadership of the House of Ibelin that had ousted Filangieri. At a general council held in Acre on 5 June 1243, the barons and prelates of the kingdom approved the position of legal scholar Philip of Novara than no oath to the king could be taken as long as he did not appear in his kingdom. As a result, the government established by Conrad II could not be recognized as legitimate, and the council installed Alice of Cyprus and her husband Raoul of Nesle. Thomas returned to Italy just prior to the loss of took the port city of Tyre, the last base of the Hohenstaufen rule in the Holy Land.

== Family ==
From his marriage to a woman whose name was unknown, Thomas had two sons, Adenolfo (died 1242) and Ciacopo (died after 1252). Adenolfo's son Thomas II of Aquino (died 15 March 1273) succeeded him as Count of Acerra.

== Bibliography ==
- Asbridge, Thomas (2012). The Crusades: The War for the Holy Land. Simon & Schuster. ISBN 978-1-84983-688-3.
- Garufi, Carlo Alberto (1938). Ryccardi di Sancto Germano Notarii Chronicon. Rerum Italicarum Scriptores, 2nd edition. Bologna.
- Gaudenzi, Augusto (1888). Ignoti monachi Cisterciensis S. Maria de Ferraria Chronica. Chronica priora. F. Giannini, Neapoli.
- Gibb, H. A. R. (1969). The Aiyūbids (PDF). A History of the Crusades (Setton), Volume II. Archived from the original (PDF) on 2023-03-26.
- Giles, Keith Richard (1987). "The Emperor Frederick II's crusade, 1215-c. 1231" (PDF). Occupational Health Science. Keele University, Ph.D Thesis. doi:10.1007/s41542-024-00176-0.
- Runciman, Steven (1954). A History of the Crusades, Volume Three: The Kingdom of Acre and the Later Crusades. Cambridge University Press. ISBN 978-0521347723.
- Setton, Kenneth M. (1969). A History of the Crusades. Six Volumes. University of Wisconsin Press.
- Stürner, Wolfgang (2009). Friedrich II. 1194–1250. Primus-Verlag, Germany. ISBN 978-3-534-23040-2.
- Tyerman, Christopher (2006). God's War: A New History of the Crusades. Belknap Press. ISBN 978-0-674-02387-1.
- Van Cleve, Thomas C. (1969). The Crusade of Frederick II (PDF). A History of the Crusades (Setton), Volume II. Archived from the original (PDF) on March 4, 2021.
