= Christopher Tyerman =

British academic and historian (born 1953)

Professor Christopher Tyerman FRHistS
- Born: 22 May 1953 (age 73)
- Occupations: Historian and academic
- Title: Professor of the History of the Crusades
- Awards: Royal Historical Society's Alexander Prize (1981)

Academic background
- Education: Harrow School
- Alma mater: New College, Oxford
- Thesis: The French and the crusade, 1313-1336 (1981)
- Doctoral advisor: Lionel Butler

Academic work
- Institutions: University of York; The Queen's College, Oxford; Exeter College, Oxford; Hertford College, Oxford

Christopher J. Tyerman (born 22 May 1953) is a British academic and historian focusing on the Crusades. In 2015, he was appointed Professor of History of the Crusades at the University of Oxford.

== Life and career ==
Tyerman was an undergraduate at New College, Oxford, and was awarded a first-class Bachelor of Arts degree in 1974; he lectured at the University of York between 1976 and 1977, before returning to the University of Oxford as a research fellow at Queen's College (1977–82); in 1981, he was awarded a doctor of philosophy degree and won the Royal Historical Society's Alexander Prize Medal. He also took up another research fellowship at Exeter College which lasted from 1982 to 1987. All the while, he had been a medieval history lecturer at Hertford College, Oxford since 1979, and in 2006 was elected one of its fellows. In 2015, he was awarded the Title of Distinction of Professor of History of the Crusades by the university.

== Works ==
Tyerman's research interests lie in crusading in medieval western Europe, which he has explored from cultural, social, religious, and political angles. He has focused especially on the high Middle Ages and medieval France. He has also published works on the history of education, including a monograph history of Harrow School. His published works include:

=== Books ===
- England and the Crusades 1095–1588 (University of Chicago Press, 1988)
- Who’s Who in Early Medieval England 1066–1272 (Shepheard Walwyn, 1996)
- The Invention of the Crusades (Macmillan, 1998)
- A History of Harrow School 1324–1991 (Oxford University Press, 2000)
- Fighting for Christendom: Holy War and the Crusades (Oxford University Press, 2004)
- The Crusades: A Very Short Introduction (Oxford University Press, 2005), collection Very Short Introductions
- God’s War: A New History of the Crusades (Penguin/Allen Lane and Belknap Press of Harvard University Press, 2006)
- The Debate on the Crusades 1099–2010 (Manchester University Press, 2011)
- The World of the Crusades: An Illustrated History (Yale University Press, 2019)
- The Practices of Crusading: Image and Action from the Eleventh to the Sixteenth Centuries (Routledge, 2020)

As editor

- An Eyewitness History of the Crusades, 4 vols. (Folio Society, 2004)
- Soldiers Nobles and Gentlemen: Essays in Honour of Maurice Keen (with Peter Coss) (Boydell and Brewer, 2009)
- New College (Third Millennium, 2010)
- Chronicles of the First Crusade (Penguin, 2011)

=== Papers ===
- "Marino Sanudo Torsello and the Lost Crusade: Lobbying in the Fourteenth Century", Transactions of the Royal Historical Society, 5th Series, vol. 32 (1982)
- "Philip V of France, the assemblies of 1319-20 and the Crusade", Bulletin of the Institute of Historical Research, vol. lvii, no. 135 (1984)
- "Sed nihil fecit? The last Capetians and the Recovery of the Holy Land", War and Government in the Middle Ages, ed. J. Gillingham & J. C. Holt (Woodbridge: Boydell Press, 1984)
- "The Holy Land and the Crusades in the Thirteenth and Fourteenth Centuries", Crusade and Settlement, ed. P. W. Edbury (Cardiff: Cardiff University Press, 1985)
- "Philip VI of France and the Recovery of the Holy Land", English Historical Review, c (1985)
- "Some English evidence of attitudes to the crusade in the thirteenth century", Thirteenth Century Studies, i, ed. S. Lloyd (Woodbridge: Boydell Press, 1986)
- "Harrow School in the late eighteenth and early nineteenth centuries", Journal of the Byron Society, 1989
- "Who went on Crusade to the Holy Land?", The Horns of Hattin, ed. B. Z. Kedar (Jerusalem, 1992)
- "Were there any Crusades to the Holy Land in the Twelfth Century?", English Historical Review, cx (1995)
- "Holy War, Roman Popes, and Christian Soldiers: Some Early Modern Views on Medieval Christendom", The Medieval Church: Universities, Heresy and the Religious Life, ed. P. Biller and B. Dobson, Studies in Church History: Subsidia 11 (Woodbridge: Boydell Press, 1999)
- "What the Crusades meant to Europe", The Medieval World, ed. P. Linehan and J. Nelson (Routledge, 2001)
- "William of Wykeham 1324–1404", New College Record, 2004
- "Principes et Populus: Civil Society and the First Crusade", Cross, Crescent and Conversion, ed. S. Barton and P. Linehan (Leiden: Brill, 2008)
- "The Expansion of Europe and the Crusades", A Companion to the Medieval World, ed. C. Lansing and E. English (Blackwell, 2009)
- "Court, Crusade and City: The cultural milieu of Louis I, duke of Bourbon", Soldiers, Nobles and Gentlemen: Essays in Honour of Maurice Keen, ed. P. Coss and C. Tyerman (Boydell and Brewer, 2009)
- "Henry of Livonia and Crusade Ideology", Crusading and Chronicle Writing on the Medieval Frontier, ed. M. Tamm, L. Kaljundi and C. Selch Jensen (Ashgate, 2011)
- "New wine in old skins? The Crusade and the Eastern Mediterranean in the Later Middle Ages", Byzantines, Latins and Turks in the Eastern Mediterranean World after 1150, ed. C. Holmes and J. Harris (Oxford Byzantine Studies, Oxford University Press, 2012)
