= Ruggero de Amicis =

Sicilian diplomat and poet

Start of a poem attributed to Ruggero in a 13th- or 14th-century manuscript. His name is encircled on the right.

Ruggero de Amicis (also d'Amico or d'Amici) was a Sicilian high administrator and diplomat under the Emperor Frederick II. He served as justiciar of western Sicily between 1239 and 1240, then as captain and master justiciar of all Sicily and Calabria from 1240 until 1241. He was Frederick's ambassador to Ayyubid Egypt from 1241 until 1242. He was also active as a vernacular lyric poet, one of the earliest members of the Sicilian school. In 1246, he joined a conspiracy against the emperor and was arrested. He died in prison.

== Family ==
Ruggero was probably a native of Messina. He held the fiefs of Cerchiara, Castiglione and Francavilla, three fiefs at Cosenza and one fief at Oriolo, all in Calabria. He was married to Venia de Dragone and they had several children, including a son named Corrado and a daughter named Margherita.

Ruggero's precise relationship to other persons named de Amicis is unknown, although they were evidently relatives. The ladies Mabilia de Amicis and Bella de Amicis were his contemporaries. They married, respectively, Ruggero of Bisaccia and Guglielmo of Montemarano. It is unclear if this Bella is the same person as the Bella de Amicis who was the mother of the famous admiral, Ruggero di Lauria. The latter's maternal uncle, Guglielmo, is described as "count of Amico" and lord of Ficarra. His father's name was Amico. According to Bartolomeo da Neocastro, he was exiled from Messina for his participation in the conspiracy of 1246. He married Macalda, who after his death married Alaimo da Lentini. In addition, there was an Orlando de Amicis recorded as a moneyer at Messina in 1262–1265.

== Royal service ==
=== Justiciar, 1239–1240 ===
In 1239, at the start of the war with the papacy, Ruggero was appointed justiciar of the island of Sicily "across the river Salso", that is, its western half. He probably took office on 10 September, the start of the indictional year. He is recorded for the first time as justiciar on 10 October 1239, when the emperor informed him that all the Sicilian members of the court had been ordered to return to Sicily. Ruggero was to confiscate the properties of any courtiers who disobeyed and to inform the court.

On 10 November 1239, the emperor ordered Ruggero to provide the names of all the men serving in positions of responsibility under him. That same day, he ordered him to assist Amaury de Montfort on his way through Sicily on the Barons' Crusade. On 18 November, he ordered him to arrest two priests and a monk accused of murdering the prior of Saint Peter's at Campogrosso. Although this violated their right to be tried by an ecclesiastical court, such rights were suspended during the war with the papacy. Ruggero took other actions against the church. On 16 November, he was ordered to collect the collecta generalis (general tax) in his province, even from the church. In December, Ruggero ordered the Franciscans out of Palermo and exiled other supporters of the papacy and their families from his jurisdiction. He granted an exemption, however, to a certain Thomas Ferentini of Palermo, a son-in-law of Bishop Aldoin of Cefalù, whose other relatives were exiled.

In February 1240, Frederick ordered Ruggero to ensure that the diplomatic mission to the Emirate of Tunis, which was sailing from Palermo, had the required number of men and that any ill member was replaced. On 1 February, he ordered him to arrest all the citizens of the rebellious city of Spoleto in his justiciarate. On 8 February, he ordered him to assure that both horses and mules were being bred for the campaign against the papacy. Ruggero also had the responsibility of enforcing a ban on the export of horses.

As justiciar, Ruggero helped complete the liquidation of the communities of Centorbi and Capizzi, which had rebelled in 1232. The cities had been razed and the inhabitants removed to Palermo. Ruggero captured all those inhabitants still at large in his jurisdiction, provided their names to the emperor and resettled them in Palermo. He also began the relocation of the Muslims of Sicily to Lucera, which was completed in the next decade.

=== Captain, 1240–1241 ===
In May 1240, Frederick placed Ruggero in charge of the entire island of Sicily and the Calabrian peninsula with the title "captain and master justiciar". The same position in the kingdom north of Calabria had already been created in October 1239 for Andrea di Cicala and the powers of the captain expanded at the diet held in Foggia on 8 April 1240. In his letter of appointment on 3 May 1240, he was instructed to assist the master chamberlain of Calabria to collect taxes in that region. He was also instructed how to handle widows whose husbands had been arrested or had their property confiscated. On 5 May, a supplementary instruction ordered that no one could act as a judge, notary, lawyer, physician or surgeon without imperial permission.

Ruggero remained as captain and master justiciar until the end of 1241.

=== Ambassador, 1241–1242 ===
Towards the end of 1241, Ruggero was picked to lead an embassy to the new sultan of Egypt, al-Malik al-Ṣāliḥ, whose father, al-Kāmil, had recently died. Frederick and al-Kāmil had signed the treaty of Jaffa in 1229, bringing to end the Sixth Crusade and turning Jerusalem over to Frederick. The purpose of Ruggero's embassy was to negotiate an extension to the treaty of 1229, the expiry of which in 1239 had led to the Barons' Crusade.

Ruggero and another envoy travelled to Alexandria aboard the ship Mezzomondo (in Arabic, Niṣf al-Dunyā, lit. 'half the world'). They brought sumptuous gifts and were received with pomp by the sultan in Cairo, but no source relates the results of their negotiations. The embassy is recorded in the Annales siculi, which place it in 1240–1241. The only eastern source to mention the embassy is the Arabic History of the Patriarchs of the Egyptian Church, which dates it to year 958 of the Era of the Martyrs or between 29 August 1241 and 28 August 1242. According to the History of the Patriarchs, the envoys, with permission, toured the country before coming to Cairo, visiting Faiyum and the Egyptian pyramids, and crossing the Nile at Giza. They remained in Egypt for some months, returning to Sicily in the spring of 1242.

== Conspiracy and death ==
Nothing is known of Ruggero's activities between his return from Egypt and his participation in the conspiracy against Frederick's life in 1246. His reasons for joining the conspiracy are unknown, but he had family ties to several other conspirators. His wife's family, the Dragone, was also involved.

Ruggero was imprisoned and died, but whether by execution or other causes is unknown. The only evidence for his imprisonment comes thirty years after his death, when a witness claimed to have heard that he had died in prison. A letter of Pope Innocent IV dated 31 May 1248 confirms his death. At that time, Innocent confirmed Ruggero's children's right to inherit their father's fiefs in Calabria. His son Corrado returned from exile only after 1266, during the reign of King Charles I, who made him a knight in 1269 and restored to him his father's fiefs. Corrado died without heirs before 1277.

== Poetry ==
Rugger belonged to the first generation of the Sicilian school of vernacular Sicilian poetry. At least one poem can be confidently attributed to him: Sovente Amor n'ha riccuto manti. It contains four stanzas, each of nine hendecasyllables and three heptasyllables. Its theme is the popular one of the "service of love". It lacks originality in both thought and form.

Other poems are attributed to Ruggero with less certainty. The modern editor of the Sicilian school, Bruno Panvini, accepts Dolze cominciamento as a work of Ruggero, although it is more commonly attributed to Giacomo da Lentini. It contains a reference to the area "from the Agri to Messina", which is reminiscent of the way in which Ruggero's captainate in Calabria was described in official Latin: a porta Roseti usque ad Pharum, "from Porta Roseti to Faro". Another poem attributed to Ruggero in one manuscript, Lo mio core che si stava, contains what may be internal confirmation. Lamenting his separation from his love in the tornada (closing stanza), the poet refers to his departure from the kingdom, possibly a reference to Ruggero's embassy. The common attribution, however, is to Bonagiunta da Lucca.

Both Sovente Amor and Lo mio core can be found in the chansonnier Vat. lat. 3793.

== Bibliography ==
- Abulafia, David (1988). Frederick II: A Medieval Emperor. Allen Lane.
- Amari, Michele (1868). Storia dei Musulmani di Sicilia. Vol. 3. Felice Le Monnier.
- De Bartholomaeis, Vincenzo (1937). "Ricerche intorno a Rinaldo e Iacopo d'Aquino". Studi medievali. n. s. 10: 130–167.
- Göbbels, Joachim (1987). "De Amicis, Ruggero". Dizionario Biografico degli Italiani, Volume 33: D'Asaro–De Foresta (in Italian). Rome: Istituto dell'Enciclopedia Italiana. ISBN 978-8-81200032-6.
- Grillo, Ernesto (1920). Early Italian Literature. Vol. 1: Pre-Dante Poetical Schools. Blackie and Son.
- Jackson, Peter (1987). "The Crusades of 1239–41 and Their Aftermath". Bulletin of the School of Oriental and African Studies, University of London. 50 (1): 32–60. doi:10.1017/s0041977x00053180. S2CID 161747361.
- Jensen, Frede, ed. (1986). The Poetry of the Sicilian School. Garland.
- Jensen, Frede (2004). "Ruggero d'Amici". In Christopher Kleinhenz (ed.). Medieval Italy: An Encyclopedia. Vol. 2. Routledge. p. 992.
- Kamp, Norbert (1975). Kirche und Monarchie im staufischen Königreich Sizilien, 1: Prosopographische Grundlegung: Bistümer und Bischöfe des Königreichs 1194–1266, 3: Sizilien. Wilhelm Fink.
- Kantorowicz, Ernst (1957) [1931]. Frederick the Second, 1194–1250. Translated by E. O. Lorimer. Frederick Ungar.
- Pirovano, Donato, ed. (2020). Poeti della corte di Federico II. Salerno Editrice.
- Scandone, Francesco (1903). "Notizie biografiche di rimatori della scuola poetica siciliana". Studie di Letteratura Italiana. 5: 226–410.
