= Cicala (disambiguation) =

Cicala is a village and comune in the province of Catanzaro, in the Calabria region of southern Italy.

Cicala may also refer to:

== People ==
- Andrew of Cicala (died 1246), nobleman and administrator in the Kingdom of Sicily
- Carlo Cicala, bishop of Albenga (1554–1572)
- Giovanni Battista Cicala (1510–1570), Italian Roman Catholic bishop and cardinal
- Giovanni Battista Cicala Zoagli (1485–1566), Doge of the Republic of Genoa
- John of Cicala (died 1216), bishop of Cefalù
- Pier-Sante Cicala (1664–1727), Italian painter
- Raffaele Cicala (born 1962), Italian business executive
- Roy Cicala (1939–2014), American producer, engineer, songwriter and musician

== Other ==
- HMS Cicala (1915), Insect-class gunboat of the Royal Navy
- The Cricket (1980 film), known in Italian as La Cicala, an erotic drama film
