= Paola Zancani Montuoro =

Italian archaeologist (1901–1987)

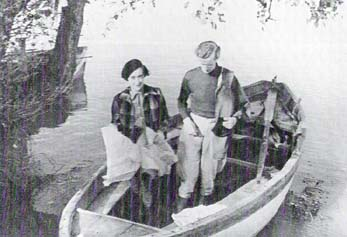
- Paola Zancani Montuoro and Umberto Zanotti Bianco
- Born: Paola Montuoro; 27 February 1901; Naples, Italy
- Died: 14 August 1987 (aged 86); Sant'Agnello, Italy
- Spouse: Domenico Zancani

Academic background
- Education: Italian School of Archaeology at Athens
- Alma mater: University of Naples
- Doctoral advisor: Giulio Emanuele Rizzo

Academic work
- Discipline: Archaeologist
- Sub-discipline: Ancient Greek art
- Notable works: "Persefone" di Taranto (1933) Haraion alla foce del Sele (1951)

Paola Zancani Montuoro (27 February 1901 – 14 August 1987) was an Italian classical scholar, archaeologist, educator and writer who specialized in ancient Greek art in Italy. After participating in the restoration of monuments around Pompei, in 1934 together with Umberto Zanotti Bianco, she embarked on excavation work in Foce del Sele which revealed the Sanctuary of Hera. From 1960, she investigated the ancient sites of Sybaris and Francavilla Marittima in Magna Graecia. She was an active member of the Accademia dei Lincei from 1956, where she served as a correspondent and editor.

== Biography ==
Born on 27 February 1901 in Naples, Montuoro was the daughter of journalist Raffaele Montuoro and his wife Clotilde Arlotta. After completing high school, she studied archaeology at the University of Naples where, under Giulio Emanuele Rizzo, she earned a doctorate in 1923. After marrying fellow student Domenico Valentino Zancani, she spent two years in the Italian School of Archaeology at Athens, specializing in Greek archaeology. While they were in Athens, her husband died of typhus but Zancani Montuoro continued the research he had begun on the pinakes of Locri.

Focusing on the artefacts of Magna Graecia, she suggested that the goddess or persephone found in Taranto had actually originated in Locri. Her work "Persefone" di Taranto (1933) attracted the attention of Umberto Zanotti Bianco with whom she embarked on the investigation of the Heraion at the mouth of the Sele, continuing the work after the end of World War II. The excavations were documented in Heraion alla foce del Sele (1951) and in three subsequent volumes. In 1958, the find was claimed to be one of the most important in the archaeology of Italy.

From the 1960s and for the rest of her active life, Zancani Montuoro turned her attention to the area around the ancient city of Sybaris. With the support of the Cassa per il Mezzogiorno, substantial excavations were carried out from 1969 to 1976. As chief editor at the Lincean Academy from 1963, Zancani Montuoro edited the reports of the many discoveries made. During the same period, she also correctly identified the importance of the Francavilla Marittima area, which led to extensive excavations of the acropolis of Timpone della Motta and the adjacent Macchiabate necropolis. In collaboration with Dutch archaeologists, she continued her research until the late 1970s.

Paola died at her home in the Sant’Agnello di Sorrento district of Naples on 14 August 1987.
