= Andrew of Cicala =

Italian nobleman and administrator

Andrew of Cicala (died 17 May 1246), known in Italian as Andrea di Cicala or Andrea Cicala, was a nobleman and administrator in the Kingdom of Sicily under the king-emperor Frederick II. He was the lord of Golisano from before 1231 and the lord of Polizzi from 1236.

Andrew served as captain of the northern half of the kingdom from 1239 until 1246 and master justiciar of the same from 1240. He was for a brief period in 1242–1243, captain over the whole kingdom. His energetic administration in the period 1239–1241, when he was facing the a papal invasion, can be traced in detail. In May 1242, he led an attack on Rieti. A loyal servant of the crown, whose counsel in military matters was sought after, he seems to have experienced a crisis of confidence in Frederick II following the latter's deposition by the Council of Lyon in 1245. He joined a conspiracy against the emperor's life and was killed during its suppression.

== Early life in Sicily ==
The Cicala family was originally from Castelcicala in the Campania. (Note: This is according to Kamp 1981 and Houben 2005. According to Kantorowicz 1957, p. 314, he was probably related to the Genoese Cicala family.) They were resolutely royalist. Andrew's father, Paul, was the count of Alife in Campania and Golisano on the island of Sicily. His mother was Sica Musca. Andrew was raised on the family's Sicilian estates. He is recorded for the first time in June 1216 in Palermo, when he and his brothers Simon and Matthew witnessed their father's donation of the Sicilian castle of Roccella to the Campanian monastery of Montevergine. Andrew married Margaret, a sister of Arduin, count of Ischia Maggiore, which brought him connections at the royal court.

Andrew succeeded his father in Golisano, but without the title of count. As lord of Golisano, he had to remit the royal tithe to the diocese of Cefalù annually. In February 1231, he persuaded Bishop Arduin of Cefalù to cede the diocese's rights in the church of Saint Philip in Golisano to the monastery of Montevergine. In November 1234, his brother-in-law drew up his will, in which he named Andrew the guardian of his daughters and the administrator of his estates in Sicily. In 1236, King Frederick enfeoffed Andrew with the lordship of Polizzi, which also paid the royal tithe to Cefalù.

== Captain from Porta Roseti to the Tronto ==
=== 1239 ===
In early October 1239, Frederick appointed Andrew captain (Note: The Latin title is capitaneus (Matthew 1992, p. 360), which is translated "captain" (Kantorowicz 1957) or "captain-general" (Van Cleve 1972) in English.) of the entire kingdom north of Calabria, from Porta Roseti to the mouth of the Tronto. This was a new office with administrative and military functions, designed to put all the resources of the mainland under a single command for the war against the Papacy. Andrew also took control of vacant dioceses. He assigned diocesan revenues to certain Roman nobles, like Manuel Frangipane, in order to undermine the Papacy. In November, Frederick also placed the University of Naples and its students under Andrew's protection.

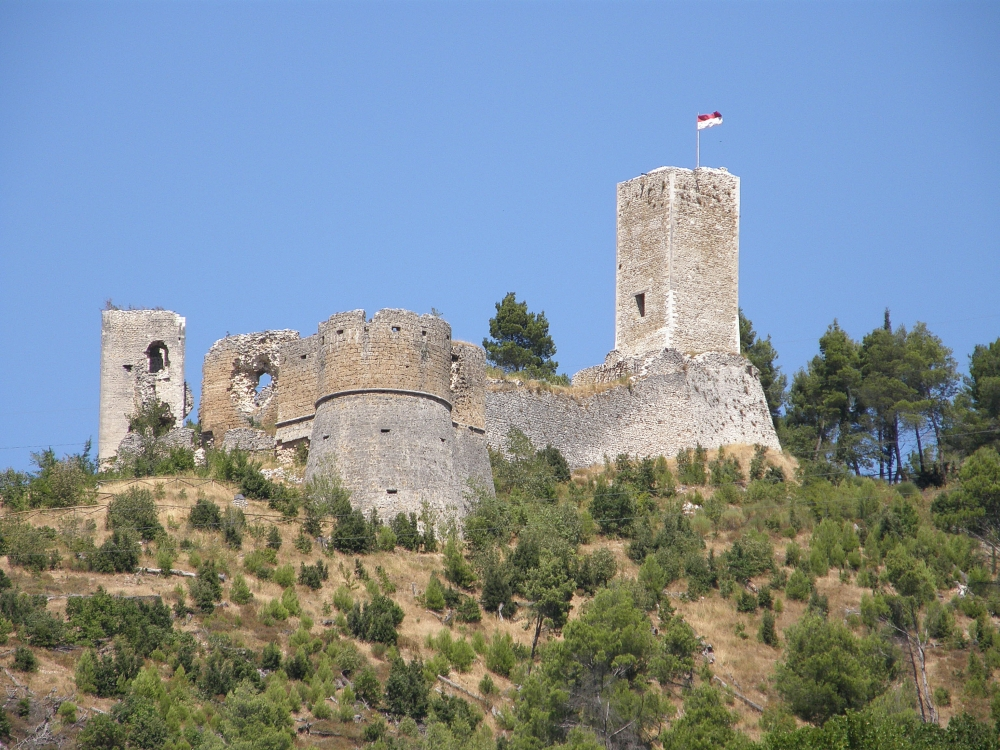
Ruins of the castle of Popoli

Andrew worked energetically to increase the number of castles under royal control and improve their readiness for war. He appointed new castellans in the fortresses of Bari, Trani, Popoli and Monticello; improved the fortifications and increased the garrisons of Montecassino, Rocca Ianula and Castel Volturno; confiscated castles from feudatories in the Marsica and Abruzzo; and occupied castles in the papal duchy of Spoleto. He took new oaths of fealty from the port officials (portulani) of Apulia, Abruzzo and Campania. He requisitioned mercenaries from the provincial justiciars to garrison the castles under his command. He proposed the destruction of some castles in the county of Fondi to improve the kingdom's strategic position. Frederick at first reserved judgement until he could see Andrew's list.

In December 1239, Andrew brought his wife over from Sicily and set her up in the castle of Teano, which was also his residence. That same month, a plot he hatched with the comune of Rieti nearly captured the pope's nephew for use as a hostage during negotiations. He received instructions from Frederick to attack papal Benevento. Without instructions, he sent a force of knights, archers and Saracens of Lucera to assist Frederick's son, King Enzo of Sardinia, in northern Italy.

=== 1240 ===
Andrew became Frederick's most important military advisor, often offering independent advice. In January 1240, he created the office of visitator castrorum (visitor of castles). Each visitator was charged with inspecting his castles twice a week and every castle in the kingdom had a visitator. That same month, Frederick assigned Andrew the responsibilities of the Magna Curia (Great Court) on the mainland and appointed two judges from the Curia, Simon and Robert of Tocco, to assist him. In February, after having begun to collect the collecta generalis (general tax), Andrew ordered an inquest into the tax collection of 1239 and into certain persons of doubtful loyalty in Abruzzo, Molise and the county of Fondi. Andrew ordered the arrest of all citizens of Terni living within the kingdom to put pressure on the comune to submit to Frederick, who had invaded the Papal State.

In March 1240, Andrew charged the procurators and castellan of Pettorano with maladministration. Later that year, he enforced the ban on the export of horses, replaced William of Spinosa as castellan of Rocca Ianula with John of Trentenaria and assembled an army of knights at San Germano. In April, he attended the imperial diet at Foggia, where he discussed with Frederick the rebellion in Rocca Alberici and two unresolved lawsuits concerning the cathedral of Aversa and two Abruzzese noblewomen. On 3 May, Frederick appointed him master justiciar of the same territory over which he was captain, effectively giving him complete viceregal authority from Porta Roseti to the Tronto. One of his first duties was to put into effect the new laws concerning judges, notaries and physicians promulgated at Foggia. He summoned the procurators of the royal domain to inspect their accounts.

=== 1241 ===
In 1241, Frederick ordered a levy of church property to pay for the war. Andrew informed the prelates at an ecclesiastical assembly at Melfi in June. To collect the church's treasures, he dispatched as emissaries Peter of Melfi to Basilicata, Martin of Airola to Montevergine, John Capuanus of Naples to Molise (Note: For details on the inventory in Molise, see Jamison 1929, p. 534 n5.) and Thomas Castulus to the diocese of Valva. The confiscated treasure was deposited at San Germano in August. Some of it was redeemed (i.e., bought back) by the churchmen, but the rest was sent to the emperor at Grottaferrata.

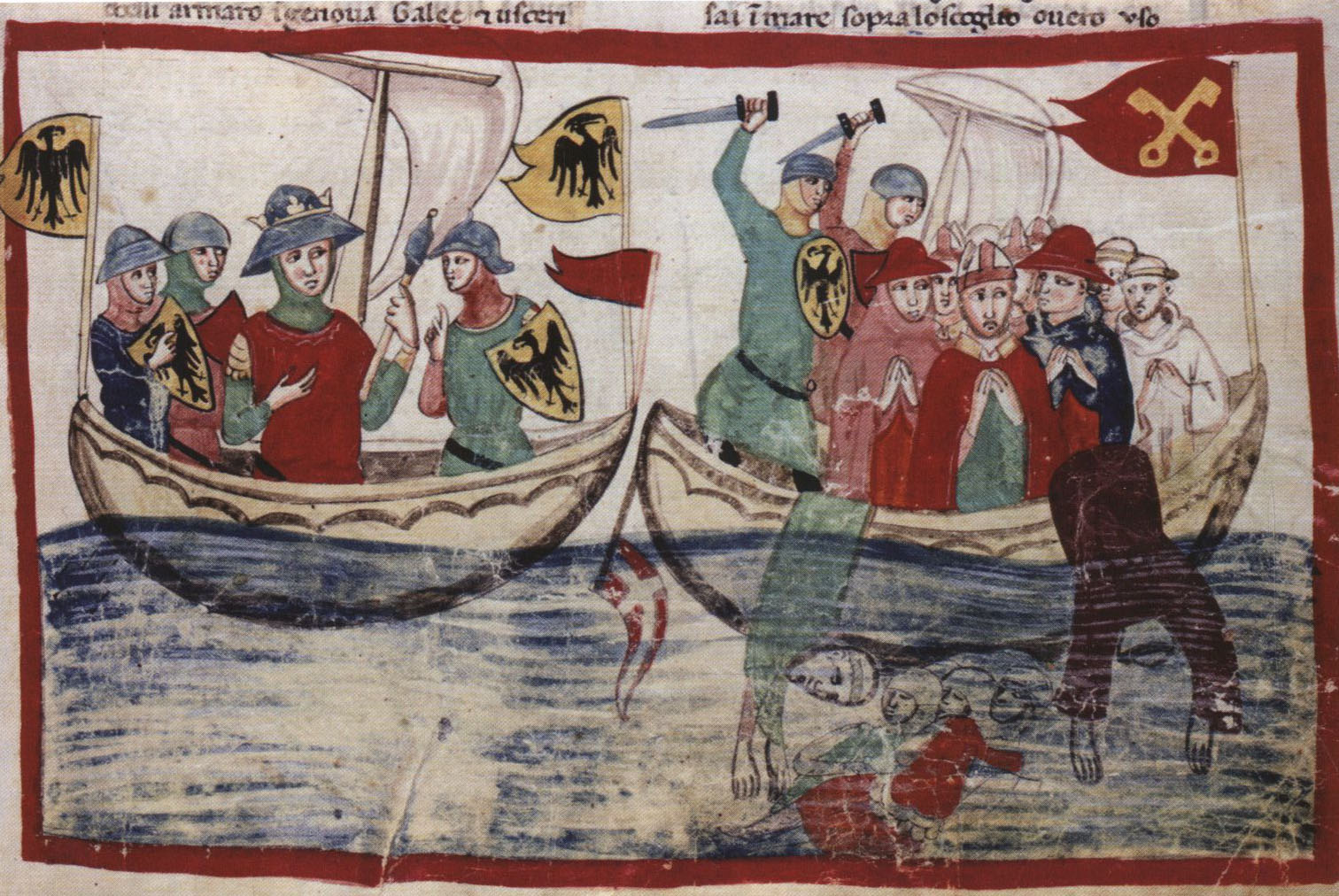
Miniature depicting the battle of Giglio and the two cardinals in red hats, from a 14th-century copy of Giovanni Villani's Nuova Cronica

In July 1241, Andrew took charge of the high-profile prisoners, including Cardinals Otto of Tonengo and James of Pecorara, who had fallen into Frederick's hands at the naval battle of Giglio in May. Taking custody of them at Naples, he had them imprisoned in Salerno. He then sent a troop of knights to Frederick's camp at Rieti, as the emperor had requested, before joining the emperor himself. Towards the end of 1241, he was once again charged with collecting the collecta generalis for the war.

=== 1242–1245 ===
In 1242–1243, the captain of Sicily and Calabria, Roger de Amicis, was sent on a diplomatic mission to Abbasids in Baghdad and the Ayyubids in Cairo. During his absence, Andrew for a time exercised the captaincy over the whole kingdom with the title capitaneus regni.

In the spring of 1242, Frederick granted Andrew the castles of Acri and Corigliano and several fiefs in Calabria as a reward for his services. In May 1242, Andrew led a group of knights in an attack on Rieti and its environs. Although it was feared he would attack Rome, he spared the city. In September, he was in Salerno, where he decided a lawsuit brought by the monastery of Santa Maria Mater Domini against the crown in favour of the former. In February 1243, he attended another diet at Foggia. Afterwards, he arranged the administration of various properties confiscated by the crown in Taranto. Towards the end of 1244, in response to the defection of Viterbo to the papal side in September, (Note: Frederick had besieged Viterbo in 1243.) he was once again charged with collecting the collecta generalis for the war. In August 1245, he held an inquest in the territory of Montecassino.

== Conspiracy and death ==
Despite years of loyal service, (Note: Kantorowicz 1957, p. 630, quotes at length from a letter of Frederick II apologizing for having snapped at him. It contains references to his "incorruptible loyalty" and "pure and constant trust".) by early 1246 Andrew had joined a conspiracy against Frederick's life. It is most likely that the deposition of Frederick II by Pope Innocent IV during the Council of Lyon in July 1245 affected his own sense of legitimacy as Frederick's viceroy. He was in contact with one of the leading conspirators, Tebaldo Francesco. After the plot was discovered, he opened the castles of Scala (Note: Matthew 1992, p. 360, gives Scala, but Kantorowicz 1957, p. 633, has Sala.) and Capaccio to the conspirators. At Capaccio they were besieged for three months until July 1246.

Andrew died on 17 May 1246, during the first confrontations between the conspirators and Frederick's forces before the final stand at Capaccio. The day of his death is recorded in the necrology of Montevergine, which also records that his wife died on 19 June without specifying the year. It is corroborated by royal records showing that the fief of Casalrotto, which Andrew had acquired from the monastery of La Cava in return for an annual payment, had escheated to the crown by 21 May 1246. The office of captain was left vacant after his death.

Andrew had only one daughter, Constance, who inherited the lordships of Golisano and Polizzi, as confirmed by Innocent IV in 1254. She was married twice. In 1277 or 1278, she married Hugh of Conches. Widowed, she married Mauger de Brussoes of France in 1279 or 1280.

== Bibliography ==
- Houben, Hubert (2005). "Andrea Cicala". Enciclopedia Federiciana. Istituto dell'Enciclopedia Italiana Treccani.
- Jamison, Evelyn (1929). "The Administration of the County of Molise in the Twelfth and Thirteenth Centuries". English Historical Review. 44 (176): 529–559. doi:10.1093/ehr/XLIV.CLXXVI.529. JSTOR 552917.
- Kamp, Norbert (1981). "Cicala, Andrea di". Dizionario Biografico degli Italiani, Volume 25: Chinzer–Cirni (in Italian). Rome: Istituto dell'Enciclopedia Italiana. ISBN 978-8-81200032-6.
- Kantorowicz, Ernst (1957) [1931]. Frederick the Second, 1194–1250. Translated by E. O. Lorimer. Frederick Ungar.
- Martin, Jean-Marie (2009). "I castelli federiciani nelle città del Mezzogiorno d'Italia" (PDF). In Francesco Panero; Giuliano Pinto (eds.). Castelli e fortezze nelle città italiane e nei centri minori italiani (secoli XIII–XV). Centro Internazionale di Ricerca sui Beni Culturali. pp. 251–269.
- Matthew, Donald (1992). The Norman Kingdom of Sicily. Cambridge University Press.
- Van Cleve, Thomas C. (1972). The Emperor Frederick II of Hohenstaufen: Immutator Mundi. Clarendon Press.
