= Għonnella =

Hooded women's cloak from Malta

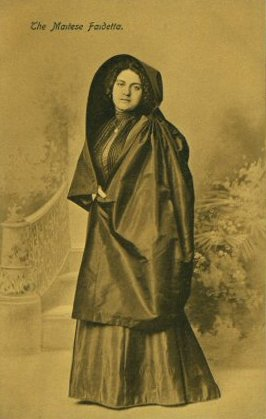
The Maltese "Faldetta", now virtually only seen in vintage photographs and historical recreations.

The għonnella (Maltese: [ɔˤˈnːɛlːɐ]; pl. għenienel [ɛˤˈnɪːnɛl]), sometimes referred to as a faldetta, is a form of women's head dress and shawl, or hooded cloak, unique to the Mediterranean islands of Malta and Gozo. There was an alternative blue version in the south-east of Malta, and it was referred to as xurqana. Another in the village of Għargħur was referred to as stamijna.

It is generally made of cotton or silk, and usually black or some other dark colour, although from the sixteenth century onwards, noble women and women from wealthier households frequently wore white or brightly coloured għenienel. The għonnella covered the head, and framed but did not cover the face. The upper part of the għonnella is starched quite stiffly, and given a broad, rounded frame, formed by means of a board, cane, or whalebone.

From a practical perspective, this broad bonnet captured much needed cooling breezes during the hot Maltese summer. On cooler days, the wearer could wrap the għonnella around her face more tightly, by making a slight adjustment. The lower part of the għonnella could be worn loosely draped around the wearer's bodice and hips, or more tightly wrapped in the case of inclement weather. It would typically fall to mid-calf length. While walking, the wearer would hold one or both sides of the għonnella clasped in her right hand.

== Origins ==
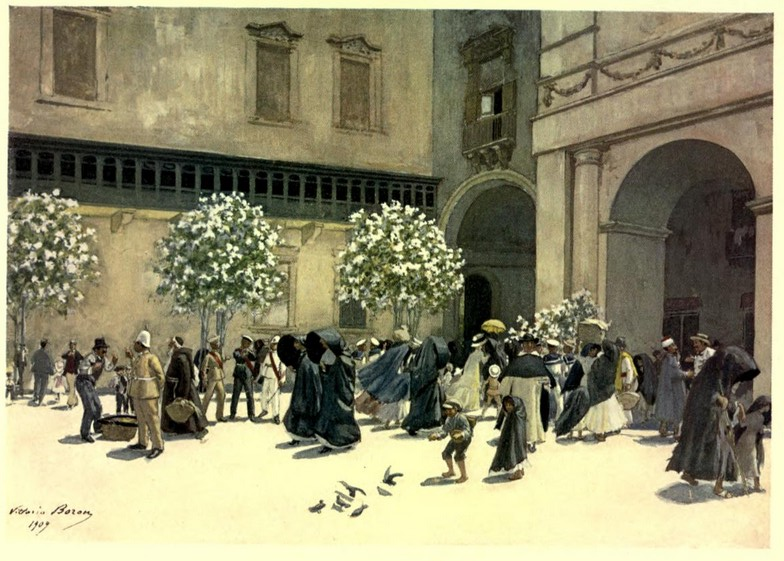
Republic Square (then Queen's Square) in Valletta in 1910

The origins of the għonnella are ultimately unclear; it has been described as a "western garment, worn in an eastern fashion." Maltese historians Ciantar and Abela were of the view that the għonnella had evolved from traditional Sicilian dress:

"One cannot deny that the frequent interchange made between the Maltese and Sicilians influenced local customs. Sicilian influence may be discovered both in the eating habits of the Maltese as well as in the costumes worn in Malta. The garb worn by the Maltese women is a case in point. The women of Malta wear a long black mantel that flows down from the head to the heels. Unlike in Sicily, the net (strascino) is not worn. Our women of the lower classes wear a mantel made of black wool. Noble women, the wives of the Professors of Law and Medicine and rich citizens wear mantels made of silk...."

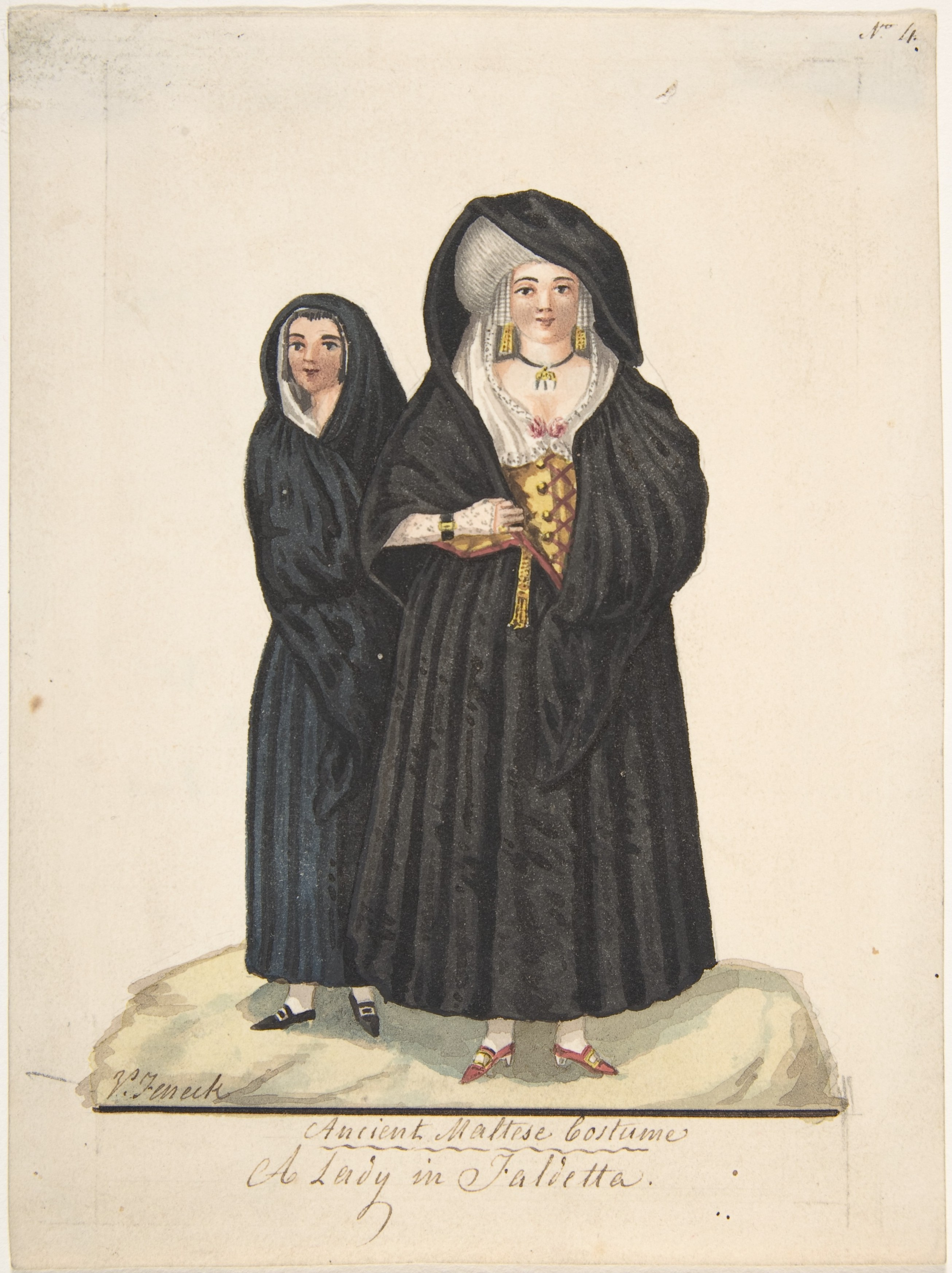
A Lady in a Faldetta

According to local legend, the għonnella was first introduced to Malta in 1224 as a sign of mourning by the women of Celano in the Abruzzi region of Italy, who were said to have been expelled - first to Sicily, and then to Malta - by Enrico de Morra, acting on the orders of Holy Roman Emperor Frederick II, following the massacre of their husbands. There is some historical evidence of this event recorded in the chronicles of Riccardo di San Germano:

"Henricus de Morra iussu imperiali Celanenses reuocat ubique dispersos, ut ad propria redeant, et redeuntes capit et in Siciliam mittit, quos apud Maltam dirigit Imperator."

An alternate legend, which plays on the similarity between the Faldetta and a traditional nun's habit, suggests that the women of Malta adopted this costume in 1798, to ward off the unwanted advances of Napoleon Bonaparte's troops. However, this theory was dismissed as a fairy tale in a National Geographic essay about Malta (1935).

According to yet another legend, the għonnella developed due to the strict Canonical requirement (pre-Vatican Council II) that women veil their head before entering a Catholic church. It is said that poorer country girls, who could not afford a cloak or shawl, met the veiling requirement by placing a spare skirt over their head, which gradually evolved into the għonnella. Others speculate that it is a vernacular modification of the eastern veil, even a local variation of the Spanish mantilla. Drawing upon this angle related to Moorish Spain, folklore even suggests some fancied at least partial Moorish origin when Malta was occupied by the Muslim Aghlabids, such as relation to the khimar (a loose type of hijab).

I have little doubt that the origin of the onnella must be sought for in the oriental veil. Laying aside the great probability that the latter was used in this island during the domination of the Arabs, I have been very much struck with the similarity which there exists between both.

[Maltese women] are rarely, if ever, seen abroad with their husbands. Their predilection for indoor life is pronounced, and when hastening to morning mass through the streets of Valletta, the shielding black hood is always in requisition, unrelieved by a touch of bright or cheerful color. ... Though the faldetta is universally worn, still, as we have already intimated, many women use it in so coquettish a manner that they not only expose their pretty faces, but they also manage to see all that goes on about them. ... The semi-Oriental custom of the sex, as observed in these islands, is doubtless a relic of their association with and descent from the Mohammedans.

There are references to the għonnella in the early records of the Knights of St. John (Order of Malta), and in eighteenth century travel books. Louis De Boiseglin, historian of the Knights of Malta wrote as follows:

"The Maltese women are little, and have beautiful hands and feet. They have fine black eyes, though they sometimes appear to squint, owing to their always looking out of the same eye; half of the face being covered with a sort of veil made of silk called Faldetta, which they twist about very gracefully, and arrange with much elegance. The women even of the highest rank, unlike their husbands, constantly preserve their costume; and any one who should adopt the French fashion would make herself very ridiculous. They are extremely fond of gold and silver ornaments, and it is not uncommon to see even the peasants loaded with trinkets of those metals."

Victorian illustrator and traveller, William Henry Bartlett, was clearly intrigued by the Faldetta, describing it as follows in 1851:

"Next, tripping lightly down the steps behind, is a Maltese lady, enveloped in her elegant black silk mantilla, a costume of which it may be said that it renders even the ugly attractive, while the pretty become positively irresistible: so grave, and yet so piquante, so nun-like, and yet so coquettish, are its rustling folds, tastefully drawn round the head, so as to throw additional expression into a deep dark eye, and to relieve a white-gloved hand, and taper Andalusian foot."

== Disappearance of the Għonnella ==
For centuries, the għonnella was ubiquitous throughout Malta, worn by virtually all adult Maltese women.

It was so popular that there were a number of seamstresses whose sole job was to design, cut and sew għenienel.

However, it rapidly fell into disuse in the 1940s and 1950s, following World War II. By the 1970s, it was rarely seen, except among the older members of the Maltese lay missionary movement, the Societas Doctrinæ Christianæ (M.U.S.E.U.M.). The għonnella completely disappeared by the end of the 20th century; one of the last known women to wear it was Ċensa Vella from Victoria, Gozo, who wore the garment until early 1991.

The hooded garment occupied a lot of relative space, and for this reason it became impractical to wear on Maltese public buses.

== See also ==
- Malta
- Culture of Malta
- Fashion
