= Giovanni Cicala =

Giovanni Cicala may refer to:

- John of Cicala (d. 1216), bishop of Cefalù
- Giovanni Battista Cicala Zoagli (1484–1565), doge of Genoa
- Giovanni Battista Cicala (1510–1570), Italian Roman Catholic bishop and cardinal
- Ioannis Kigalas (c. 1622 – 1687), Greek Cypriot scholar active in Italy
