= Henry of Morra =

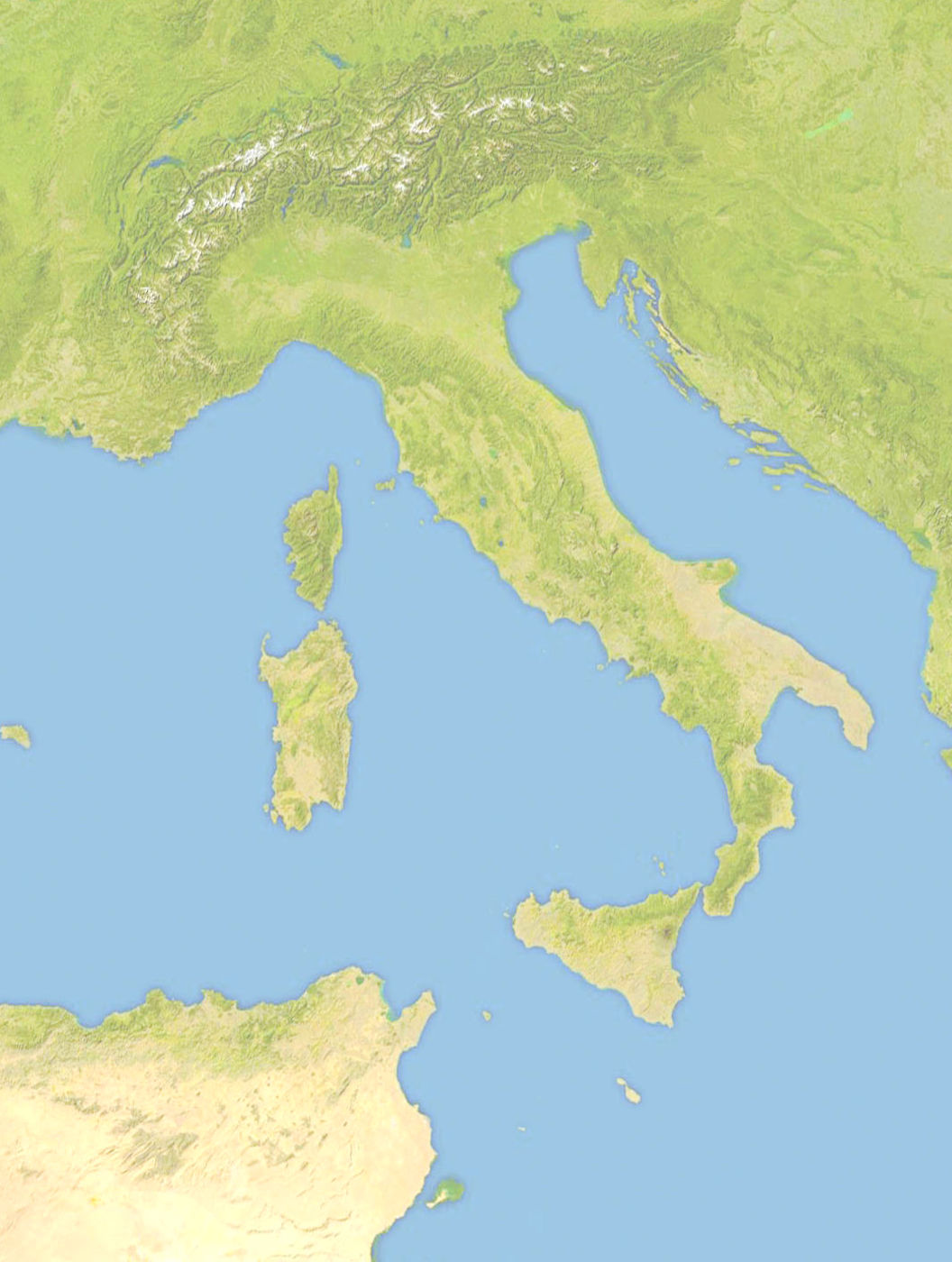
Places where Henry was active. Palermo was the capital of the kingdom, Morra the seat of his barony.

Henry of Morra (died September 1242) was a nobleman, judicial official and sometime regent of the Kingdom of Sicily, which at the time covered both the island of Sicily and the mainland southern Italy. As master justiciar of the Magna Curia from 1223 until his death, he was the most prominent official in the Sicilian court of Frederick II, King of Sicily and Holy Roman Emperor.

== Curial official ==
Henry held the barony of Morra in the county of Conza. He was a familiaris regis (member of the royal household) and a judge who sat on the Magna Curia (Great Court). Although the Magna Curia was reserved for professional jurists after 1221, it is unlikely that Henry had any special training. He succeeded Bishop Richer of Melfi as president of the Curia sometime between March 1221 and the first months of 1223. He continued to preside over the Curia until his death with the title of "master justiciar of the imperial great court". From this point on, he often acted as Frederick II's prime minister.

Early in his tenure, while the Magna Curia sat in Palermo on the island, Henry was "in the emperor's service" (pro imperialibus servitiis) on the mainland. He was Sorrento in June 1223, at Salerno in September and in the Terra di Lavoro in November. His remit often saw him enforcing the Assizes of Capua in favour of the church against the nobility and even against the government. He found in favour of Santa Maria de Luco in May 1224, in favour of the provost of Santa Maria di Mugilano in July 1225, in favour of the abbey of Montecassino in May 1226, in favour of the bishop of Rapolla in October 1230 and in favour of two dependencies of Montecassino in July 1232. At Taranto in March 1231, he sat on a tribunal with Roffredo di San Germano and Pier della Vigna to hear an appeal from the procurator of the abbey of La Trinità della Cava against the baron Gualtiero Gentile. They rewarded the abbey possession of Casalrotto.

In 1231, he ordered Robert of Busso to conduct an inquiry into gangs, forgers, gamblers, taverners and murderers, as well as luxurious living, carrying weapons around in public and raping women at San Germano. Henry made himself locally unpopular by publishing the names of both informants and accused in January 1232.

== Regent and chief minister ==
In 1226, Henry exercised the regency in the Duchy of Apulia while Frederick was fighting the Lombard League in northern Italy. In 1229, during the War of the Keys between Frederick and Pope Gregory IX, he defended the Campania from invasion. On 17 March, he suffered a defeat near San Germano at the hands of Pandulf of Anagni. He retreated to Capua and launched punitive attacks towards Benevento.

Henry was present for the drafting and issuing of the Constitutions of Melfi in 1230–1231. In 1232, he was a member of an embassy to Gregory IX in Rome. He was back in Apulia by January 1233. In April 1235, he was selected by Frederick to be one of the five members of a regency council during Frederick's absence in Germany, which lasted five years. (Note: The other four original members were Thomas of Acerra and archbishops Berard of Palermo, James of Capua and Tancred of Otranto. In 1235 or 1236, the late Tancred was replaced by Bishop Peter of Ravello.) During this time, Henry and fellow regent Thomas of Acerra visited the emperor in Germany in 1236 and 1237.

In the autumn of 1237, Henry inspected the work on fortifications at San Germano and levied fines on those who drew away workers. In 1237 and 1238, he visited Frederick in northern Italy. From August 1239 until at least December 1240, he and the rest of the Magna Curia were with the imperial court in northern Italy. He presided over a meeting of the Curia in Faenza in December 1240, which is the latest notice of his activity. According to Richard of San Germano's chronicle, he died in September 1242.

== Family ==
Henry had three sons and a daughter. James was the captain general of the Duchy of Spoleto from 1240 to 1242 and vicar general of the March of Ancona in 1244. Geoffrey and Roger were involved in a conspiracy to assassinate Frederick in 1246. They were arrested and either blinded or executed. Henry's only known daughter, Anna, married James, baron of Roccaromana, in 1228.
