= Timpone della Motta =

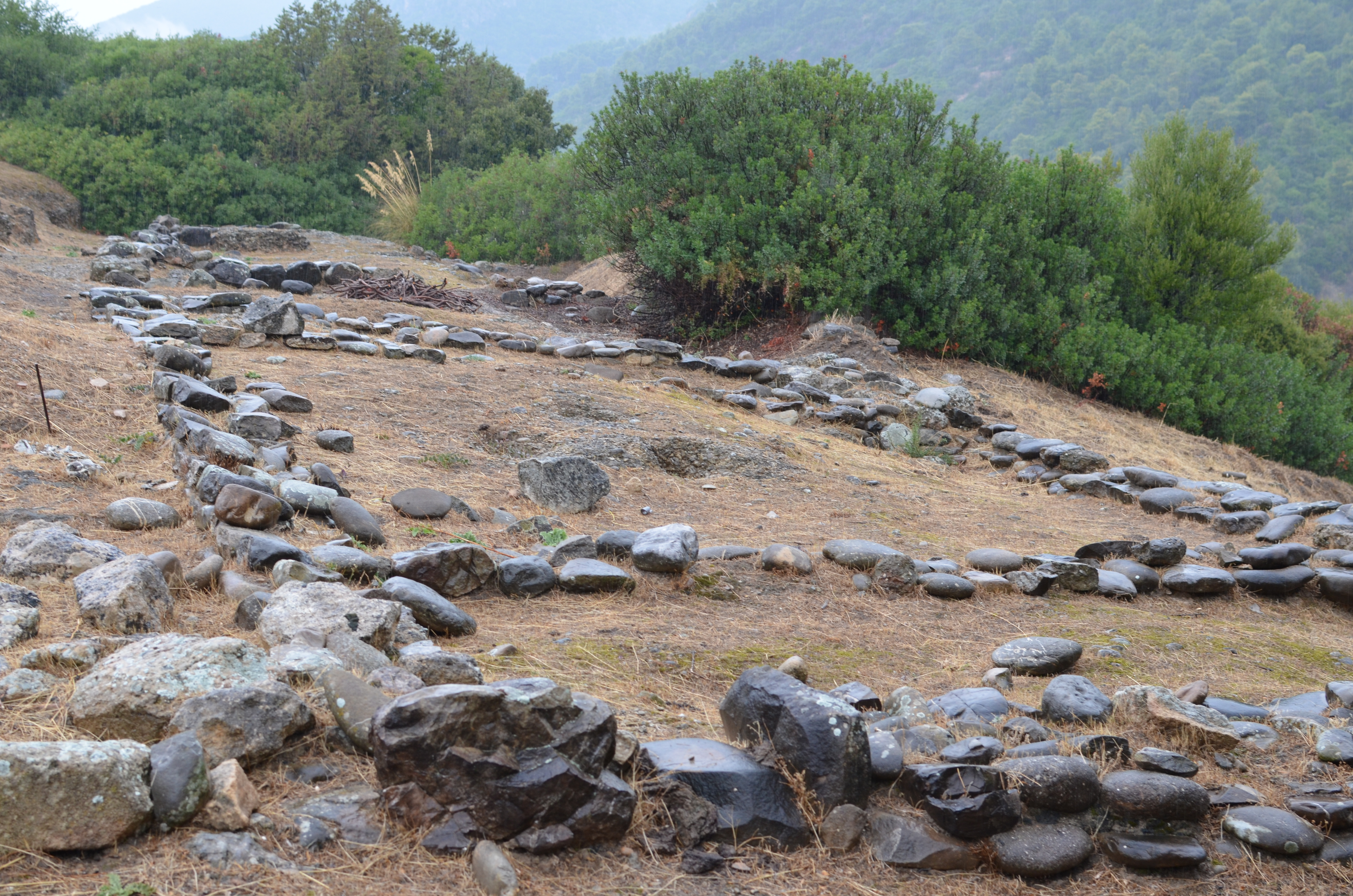
- The remains of Temple I on the acropolis of the Timpone della Motta

- Location within Italy
- 39°48′28″N 16°22′7″E
- Type: Settlement, later sanctuary
- Periods: Middle Bronze Age to Classical Greece
- Location: Francavilla Marittima, Province of Cosenza, Calabria, Italy

The Timpone della Motta is a hill 2 km to the southwest of Francavilla Marittima in Calabria, Italy that was inhabited since the Middle Bronze Age. In the Iron Age the hill was the site of an Oenotrian settlement. The Oenotrians were influenced by the culture of the Greek colonists from nearby Sybaris, who eventually took over the site in the second half of the seventh century and transformed it into their acropolis and an important sanctuary, which was notable as the site of the first known ancient Greek temples of Magna Graecia on the Italian Peninsula.

The hill was abandoned when the Bruttians conquered the region in the fourth century BC.

== Geography ==
The hill is composed of Plio-Pleistocene fan-delta deposits containing thick beds of conglomerated river cobbles, which form its cap rock and several terraces along its slopes. With an elevation of 280 meters above sea level, it overlooks the coastal plain of Sibari and the Gulf of Taranto. It lies on the left (northern) bank of the seasonal Raganello river. Close to the hilltop is the acropolis, which was the location of a sanctuary with three temples. The acropolis was surrounded by a defensive wall. Several of the conglomerate-supported terraces have evidence of settlement and the Macchiabate necropolis lies at the foot of the hill but is separated from it by the Carnevale gully. The ancient Greek city of Sybaris was located at a distance of 15 kilometers to the southeast.

== History ==
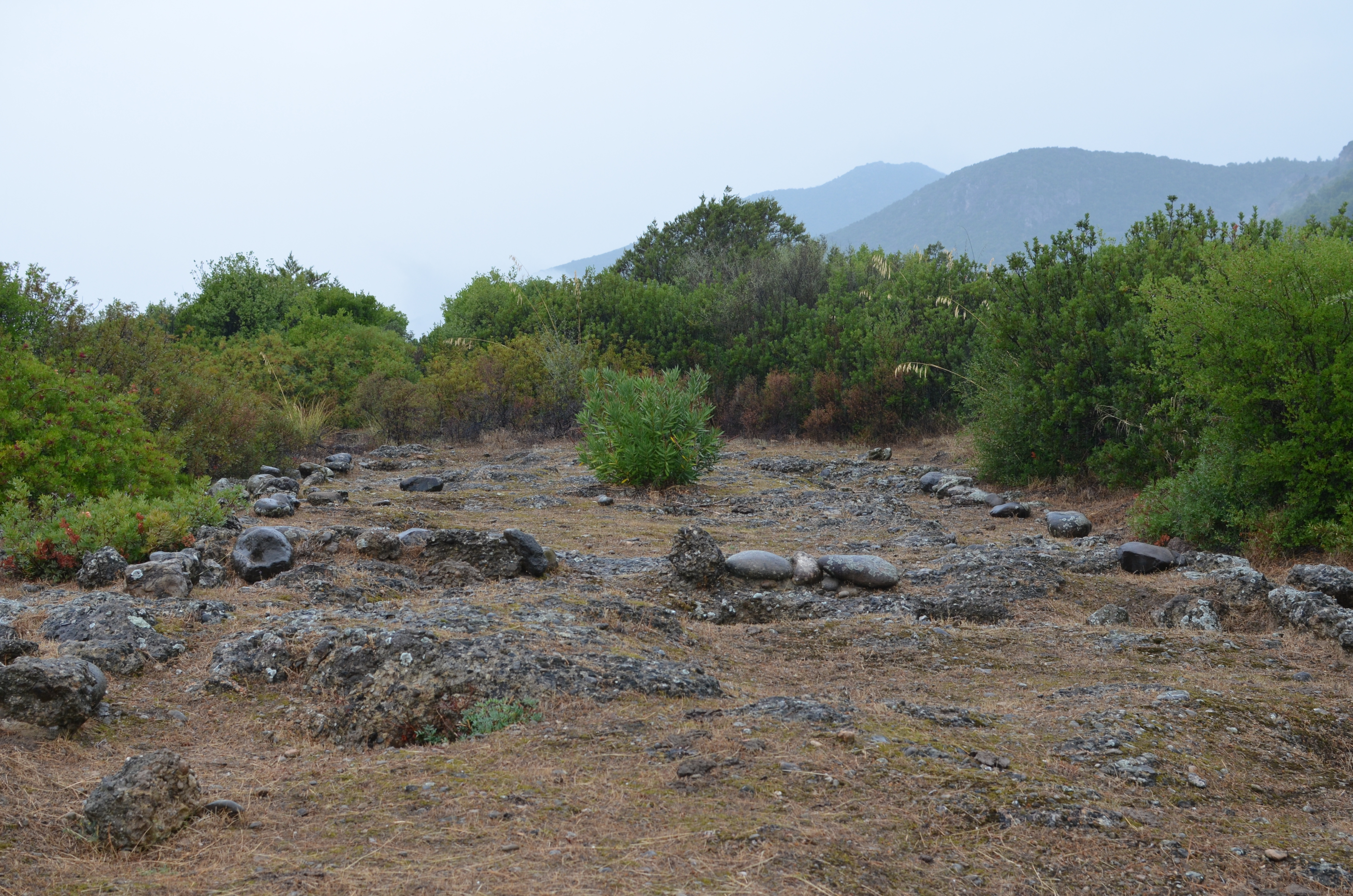
The remains of Temple III on the acropolis

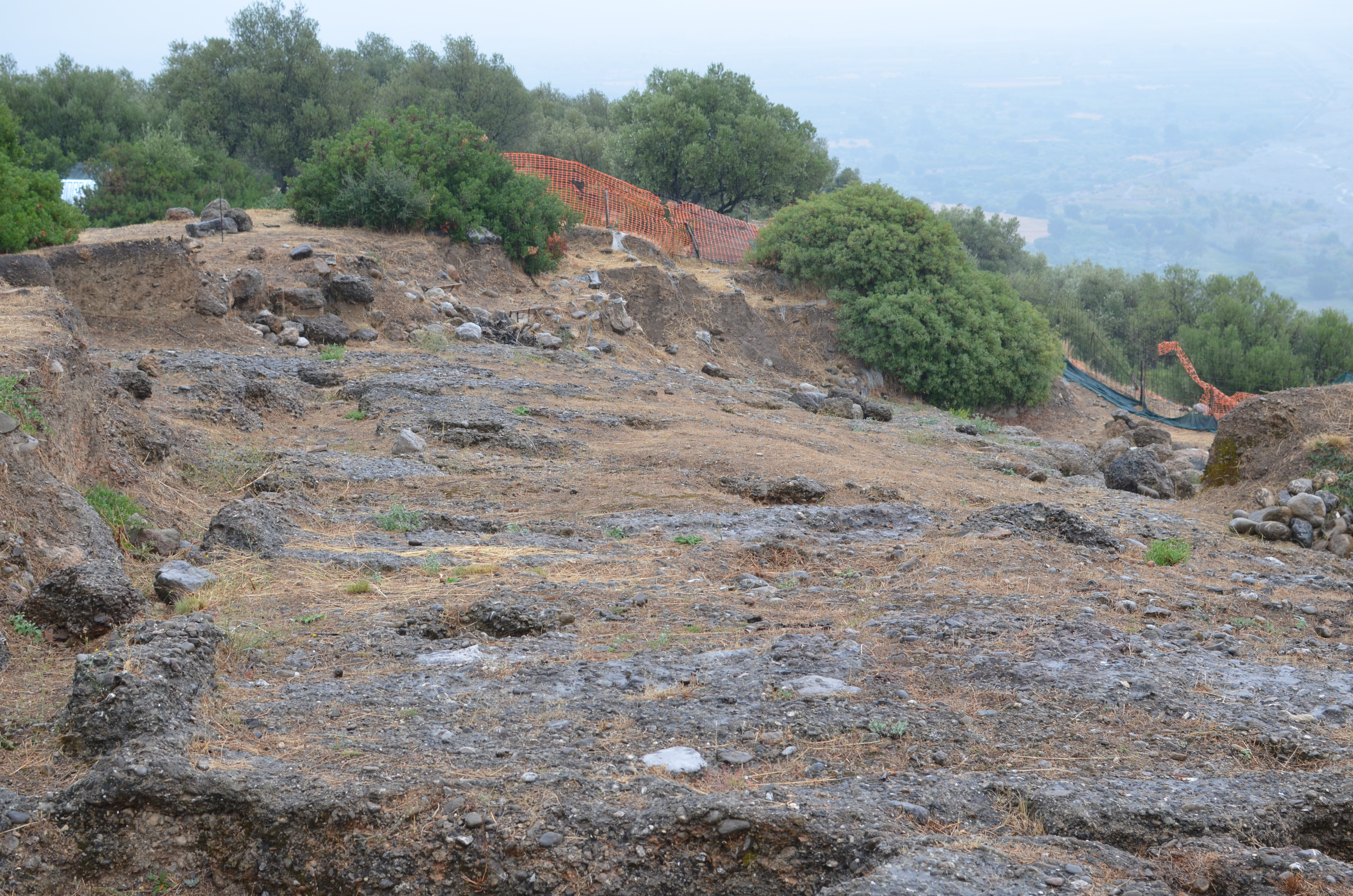
The remains of Temple V and the later Byzantine chapel on the acropolis

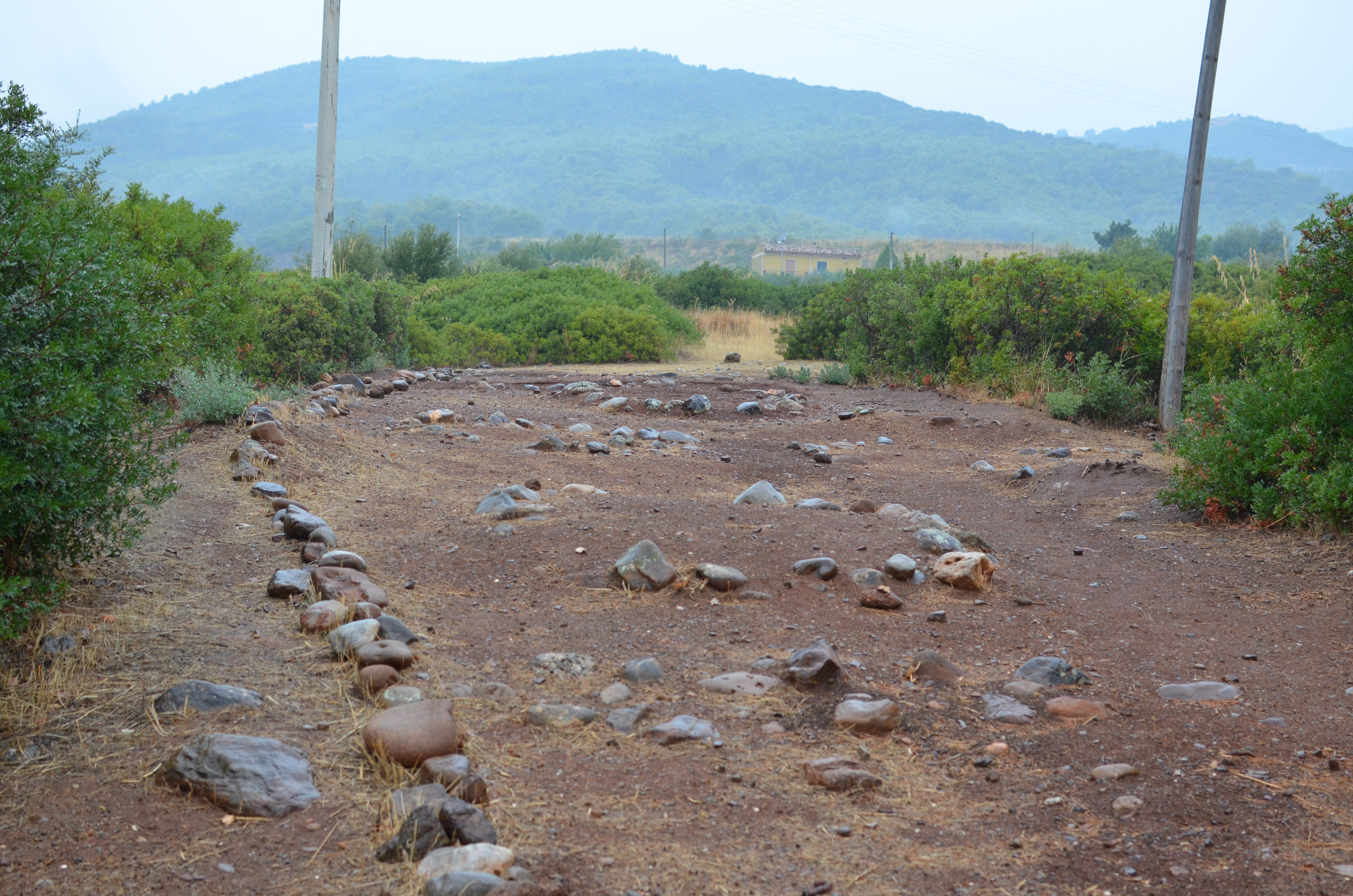
The Macchiabate necropolis at the foot of the Timpone della Motta

=== Oenotrian period ===
The oldest remains belong to a Middle Bronze Age dwelling which stood on the later site of Temple V on the acropolis. During the Iron Age in the ninth and eight centuries BC the hill was the site of a large Oenotrian settlement. Archaeological evidence indicates that a weaving house stood at the site of the Bronze Age dwelling in this period. This building was three times the size of a contemporary native hut discovered on Plateau I and might have had a religious function as well.

In the last quarter of the eight century BC this house and the other Oenotrian apsidal wooden dwellings on the acropolis were replaced by long rectangular wooden temples dedicated to Athena. The temples followed a Greek design but were constructed with native techniques. They were built around a plaza in the centre, with Temple I to the northeast of the plaza, Temple V (built on the location of the weaving house) to the southwest and Temple III to the northwest. Temples I and V were built parallel to the length of the plaza, but Temple III had an entrance which faced the plaza.

These temples were the first known ancient Greek temples on the Italian Peninsula. The Greek colony Sybaris was founded around the same time in 720 BC and it is likely that the Oenotrians and the Greeks co-operated in the construction of the temples at a time when Greek religion was transmitted to the Oenotrian culture.

=== Greek period ===
In the second half of the seventh century BC the sanctuary was taken over by the Sybarites, who changed its layout by erecting small temples, the first in mudbrick on top of the old wooden temples, which were demolished. Pottery and bronze ex-votos have revealed that the site was dedicated to Athena who is mentioned in a famous inscription on a bronze tablet:

Kleombrotos, son of Dexilaos, an Olympic champion, dedicates an aedicule (a small shrine) to the goddess in exchange for keeping the tenth part of his winnings otherwise owed her.

They celebrated large festivals there regularly.

In the sixth century BC an intensive building program was started at the site leading to the construction of large colonial houses on all the plateaux and the rearrangement of the sanctuary. The mudbrick Temple V was demolished and a gravel foundation was used to eliminate the height difference of the site of Temple V with the rest of the acropolis. A new Temple V made of stone replaced the older temple. New stone temples also replaced Temple III and I, which were built on a stone foundation of riverbed cobbles.

Attic pottery found at the site is from the years in which Sybaris perished, 510 BC, suggesting that Timpone Motta continued after the demise of Sybaris and still imported pottery from Athens.

The site must have been abandoned when the Bruttians conquered the region at some time in the fourth century BC. Centuries later a Byzantine chapel was constructed on top of the foundations of Temple V, but there is no evidence of a settlement existing in this period.

=== Identification as Lagaria ===
Thousands of hydriskai were found on the acropolis. Because there is no natural source of water on the Timpone della Motta, these hydriskai must have been used to carry water up the hill. The images of processions seen on the pottery found at the site show women carrying water and Athena is associated with Epeius in mythology. Combined with ancient literary evidence this had led to the proposal that the Timpone della Motta was the site of Lagaria. An older source places Lagaria much further north however, near Valsinni.

== Excavation ==
The first excavation of the Macchiabate necropolis was started in 1963 by Paola Zancani Montuoro.

In the 1970s and 1980s illegal excavations took place on a large scale on the southern slope of the Timpone della Motta and in the necropolis. Many stolen artefacts were sold on the antiquities market to private collectors and museums. Eventually these were identified and most of them were returned to the Museo Nazionale Archeologico della Sibaritide, where the finds from Timpone della Motta are exhibited.

Following a brief rescue excavation on the acropolis in 1986-7, excavations on the acropolis and terraces and surveys in the Macchiabate area continued from 1991 until 2008 by the Groningen Institute of Archaeology.

Excvations have continued from 2009.

== See also ==
- Magna Graecia
