= Roseto Capo Spulico =

- Comune
- Comune di Roseto Capo Spulico
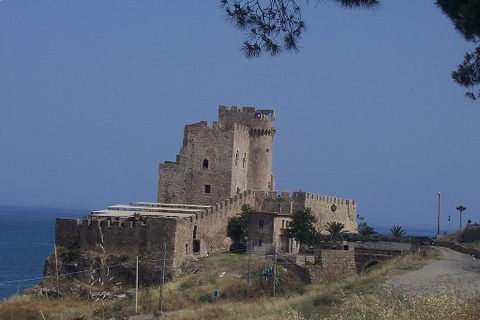
- View of the Castrum Petrae Roseti in Marina di Roseto Capo Spulico

- Location within Italy Location within Calabria
- Coordinates: 39°59′N 16°36′E
- Country: Italy
- Region: Calabria
- Province: Cosenza (CS)
- Frazioni: Centro, Borgata Marina, Villaggio Baiabella

Government
  - Mayor: Rosanna Mazzia

Area
  - Total: 30 km^{2} (12 sq mi)
- Elevation: 217 m (712 ft)

Population (31 August 2011)
  - Total: 1,914
  - Density: 64/km^{2} (170/sq mi)
- Demonym: Rosetani
- Time zone: UTC+1 (CET)
  - Summer (DST): UTC+2 (CEST)
- Postal code: 87070
- Dialing code: 0981
- Website: Official website

Roseto Capo Spulico is a town and comune in the province of Cosenza in the Calabria region of southern Italy. Roseto was originally one of the satellite cities of Sybaris during the period of Magna Grecia, a term referring to the coastal areas of Southern Italy on the Tarentine Gulf that were extensively populated by Greek settlers.

The name Roseto Capo Spulico is derived from the roses that were historically cultivated in the area. These rose petals were used to fill the mattresses on which the sybaritic slept. The Rose Garden today was born in the tenth century AD and reached its peak in 1260 when the Castrum Petrae Roseti (castle of Roseto) was built.

One of the notable landmarks in Roseto Capo Spulico is The Church of the Immaculate Conception, a rustic masonry church built in the 15th century that sits on the edge of a cliff, offering scenic views and historical value.

Today, Roseto Capo Spulico is known as a tourist destination for its beaches and seaside resorts.
