= Casalrotto =

Medieval village in southern Italy

Coordinates: 40.620°N 17.016°E

Casalrotto (medieval Latin: Casal Ruptum) was a medieval village (casalis) in the Murge in southern Italy between the 11th and 14th centuries. The remains of the village are located in a ravine beside an 18th-century farmhouse 2 kilometres (1.2 mi) southwest of Mottola.

The village is generally thought to have grown up around the church of Sant'Angelo. This was probably a Greek foundation of the Byzantine period. Following the Norman conquest of Apulia, a policy of "latinization" and "catholicization" was adopted. In 1081, the monasterium Sancti Angeli in Casali Rupto was granted to the Benedictine monastery of La Trinità della Cava dei Tirreni. The dedication to Michael the Archangel, suggests that the church served a Lombard population, as the Lombards were especially devoted to that saint. In 1231, a judicial panel composed of Henry of Morra, Roffredo di San Germano and Pier della Vigna confirmed that Casalrotto belonged to La Cava against the claims of the nobleman Gualtiero Gentile.

Casalrotto consists of about one hundred natural karst caves enlarged by human action to make residences and other spaces. Many residential caves had wooden partitions and carved niches. They also often had vegetable gardens enclosed by dry stone walls. Northwest of the residential area is a necropolis. To the northeast is a cave with traces of paint that might have been the church of Santa Maria, built between 1155 and 1165. To the southwest is the church of Sant'Angelo, a two-storey cave church with frescos from the 12th–14th centuries.

Some of the residential caves, partially collapsed, had been reused as reservoirs in the 16th and 17th centuries. Today, the site lies in the Terra delle Gravine park. Archaeological investigations were undertaken in 1979 and 1982. There was evidence of decline already by the 13th century.
