= Raffaele Cicala =

Italian business executive

- Born: Napoli, Italia
- Education: Degree in economics (BS) from the University of Naples

Raffaele Cicala is an Italian business executive working in Europe. Since 2011, he has occupied the positions of CEO of the LaSer Group and of LaSer Cofinoga.

== Biography ==
After obtaining his degree, in 1985, he joined Procter & Gamble Italy and quickly reached the position of Group Manager. In 1989, he joined The Boston Consulting Group (BCG) as a consultant assigned to the Paris office where his prime areas of focus were consumer goods and retail. In 1991, he returned to Italy with the opening of BCG office in Milan and contributed to its expansion by using his experience and knowledge to the benefit of industrial and financial entities. In 1997, he set The Boston Consulting Group office up in Warsaw of which he became Managing Partner, working throughout Eastern Europe. He worked as advisor to the Warsaw Stock Exchange, on its development and privatization strategy. In 2001, he returned to Italy where he set the Rome office up. In 2006, Raffaele Cicala joined the Unicredit Group, his former client he assisted for many years with its international growth strategy. While there, he occupied a number of positions before becoming Executive Vice-President, and obtaining seat on the Group's Executive Management Committee and on the Executive Committee for the retail banking branch as head of the Unicredit Group Household Financing Division. In 2010, he published a report, "Rapporto sul Credito alle Famiglie" ("Report on Credit to Households"), on the evolution of customer profiles in the consumer credit market in Italy. In 2011, he was appointed CEO of the LaSer Group, a joint venture of Galeries Lafayette and BNP-Paribas Personal Finance, a leading player in the consumer credit market and a provider of services to large retailers. In December 2012, Raffaele Cicala, in collaboration with several enterprises, created the Manège de Chaillot Trust Fund, with the objective of providing support to create and stage productions for the Théâtre National de Chaillot in Paris (Chaillot National Theatre). He was elected Chairman of the Board of Directors of the Manège du Chaillot Trust Fund.

== Functions and offices ==
- CEO, LaSer
- CEO, LaSer Cofinoga
- Member of Executive Committee, Galeries Lafayette group
- Member of the Board, Solfea Bank
- CEO, Sygma Banque
- Chairman, LaSer Loyalty
- Permanent representative of LaSer on the Supervisory Board of Xange Capital
- Member of the board, LaSer Nederland BV
- Member of the board, Ekspresbank
- Member of the board, LaSer Nordic Services
- Chairman of the Board of Directors, Manège de Chaillot

== Books ==
- Consommation année zéro, les new deals du consommateur, Le cherche-midi, May 2014
