= Aldoin (bishop of Cefalù) =

Aldoin, also spelled Arduin or Harduin (died 1248), was the bishop of Cefalù from 1217 until his death. He is best known for his three exiles (1222–1223, 1226–1227, 1235–1248) and his trial for maladministration in 1223–1224.

== Early life ==
Aldoin was a native of Cefalù in the kingdom of Sicily. He belonged to the knightly class of the nobility and was educated in law and rhetoric. Aldoin was from at least 1205 a notary of the royal chancery. Between 1208 and 1212, he was one of the most active notaries of the chancery, responsible for almost a quarter of its known production. He was a layman. He drew up his last charter for Queen Constance of Sicily in July 1216.

== Bishop ==
=== Early years ===
Aldoin was elected to succeed John of Cicala as bishop in May 1217 and the first document referring to him as bishop-elect is from 18 May. He was consecrated sometime between December 1217 and March 1218. In 1219, Honorius III appointed him a papal judge delegate alongside Archbishops Berard of Palermo and Carus of Monreale in a case involving the church of Santa Maria dell'Ammiraglio. In 1220, he was again appointed a judge delegate, this time alongside the abbot of Santo Spirito, in a lawsuit between the church of San Cataldo and the cathedral of Palermo.

Aldoin visited Emperor Frederick II in Germany and Honorius III in Viterbo sometime between October 1219 and June 1220. It is probably in connection with his visit to Frederick that he was recognized as a familiaris domini regis ('one of the lord king's household'), a title attested in April–May 1220. Aldoin objected at the time to various exactions made by Archbishop Berard and Count Alamanno da Costa on behalf of the crown and for the support of the Fifth Crusade. He also objected to the embargo on trade with Genoa. By the end of the year, he had fallen out with Frederick.

At some point before 1220, Aldoin took control of the castle of Cefalù, which guarded the harbour. He appointed his brother Roger to serve as castellan.

=== First exile ===
In November 1221, Aldoin was at Frederick's court in Palermo, but by December he was again resisting the royal government. In the autumn of 1222, he was accused by his own cathedral chapter of impropriety. In general, he was charged with "squandering Church property". Frederick summoned both the accused and his accusers to appear before him in Messina. Aldoin ignored the summons and appealed to the pope. Frederick, believing the accusations, expelled Aldoin from his diocese and appointed two procurators to administer its temporalities.

On 26 September 1222, Aldoin went into the first of his three exiles. Honorius III at first sided with the bishop, granting a privilege to Aldoin in January 1223. In March, he met Frederick II at Ferentino and agreed to an investigation of the charges against Aldoin after the bishop was restored. Frederick's mother, Queen Constance, had relinquished the legatine authority of the crown over the Sicilian church and, in consequence, Frederick had to acquiesce to a papal trial. He did, however, write to the pope to recommend the accusers.

=== Trial ===
Aldoin returned to Cefalù on 12 April 1223. By 23 June, he had been restored to power. His trial, contrary to the pope's instructions, had begun in the interim under the abbot of Santo Spirito, acting as delegate for the appointed judge, Archbishop Luke of Cosenza. This had to be quashed and a new trial started in December 1223 under Bartholomew, the treasurer of Cosenza. Although Aldoin made an energetic defence, he strengthened his position by excommunicating witnesses and even the judge. He made "extravagant claims to damages" incurred during Frederick's absence in Germany in 1216–1220 and demanded compensation for the costs of his trips to Rome.

Aldoin was accused of misusing church property and failing to maintain his church. He was also accused of keeping mistresses, two in Cefalù and one in Palermo, and of having fathered two sons and two daughters. He denied being the father of one and did not respond to the other accusations. He was accused of having given church property to his relatives, including a certain Christian and Leo. To a mistress named Rose, who lived in Cefalù, he was said to have given tithes; to one in Palermo, grain, wine, meat and silk that belonged to the church. He was accused of providing an illegitimate son with a benefice and a daughter with one of the church's villeins as a servant. Lead which had been procured to repair the windows of the cathedral he was said to have sold for cash.

No judgement was issued, first, because Aldoin accepted the appointment of a coadjutor, Thomas, canon of Messina, and, second, because Honorius ruled that the archbishop lacked the authority to re-delegate his responsibility once his first delegate had been dismissed, thereby nullifying the proceedings. The pope voided the appointment of a coadjutor and entrusted any retrial to Archbishops Berard of Palermo and Lando of Reggio. Nothing apparently came of this. The pope did confirm that the castle of Cefalù belonged to the king and not the bishop.

=== Second exile and return ===
In May 1225, Honorius charged Aldoin with excommunicating the monks of Santissimo Salvatore in Lingua Phari and ordering a new election for the archimandritate. He was prevented from fulfilling this charge because of his second exile, although the first evidence of this is a list of seven exiled Sicilian bishops made by Honorius in April 1226. By 1227, however, Aldoin had been reconciled to Frederick and returned to Cefalù.

Aldoin spent the next few years in Cefalù. In July 1227, acting on behalf of the vacant archdiocese of Messina, he consecrated the church of the Holy Trinity in Geraci. In February 1231, at the request of Andrew of Cicala, he turned over the church of Saint Philip in Collesano to the monastery of Montevergine.

=== Third exile and death ===
The start date of Aldoin's third exile is uncertain. In 1248, Cardinal Raniero Capocci referred to his having been exiled for fifteen years, putting the start of his exile in 1233. Aldoin was certainly outside of the kingdom by July 1234, when he was with the papal curia in Rieti, where Frederick II was also. He was still with the curia in Spoleto in August. He was certainly exiled by April 1235, when Frederick, at a Hoftag in Fano, declared his presence in the kingdom intolerable on account of his disloyalty. This was a permanent ban.

The pope protested Aldoin's exile, but the bishops remained in exile the rest of his life. In 1239, Frederick exiled Aldoin's relatives. Aldoin spent his exile in Rome, where he consecrated churches on behalf of the pope. He took part in the consecrations of Santa Sabina (16 November 1238), Sant'Eusebio (19 March 1239) and San Lorenzo in Nicolanaso (28 March 1241). He retained a measure of control over his diocese. At his request, on 18 March 1244, Pope Innocent IV annulled Frederick's grant of a benefice of Cefalù. He also cooperated with Innocent in making canonical provisions with Cefalù's benefices.

In 1248, Aldoin was murdered near the Lateran Basilica by a partisan of Frederick.

== Bibliography ==
- Kamp, Norbert (1975). Kirche und Monarchie im staufischen Königreich Sizilien, 1: Prosopographische Grundlegung: Bistümer und Bischöfe des Königreichs 1194–1266, 3: Sizilien. Wilhelm Fink.
- Kamp, Norbert (2002). "The Bishops of Southern Italy in the Norman and Staufen Periods". In G. A. Loud; A. Metcalfe (eds.). The Society of Norman Italy. Brill. pp. 185–209.
- Kantorowicz, Ernst (1957) [1931]. Frederick the Second, 1194–1250. Translated by E. O. Lorimer. Frederick Ungar.
- Loud, Graham (2009). "The Chancery and Charters of the Kings of Sicily (1130–1212)". The English Historical Review. 124 (509): 779–810. doi:10.1093/ehr/cep182.
- Pybus, H. J. (1930). "The Emperor Frederick II and the Sicilian Church". Cambridge Historical Journal. 3 (2): 134–163. doi:10.1017/s1474691300002444.
- Winkelmann, Eduard (1884). Bischof Harduin von Cefalu und sein prozess: Eine episode aus dem leben Kaiser Friedrichs II. Druck der Wagner'schen Universitäts-Buchdruckerei.
