= Sybaris =

Important city of Magna Graecia

- Σύβαρις (Ancient Greek); Sibari (Italian)
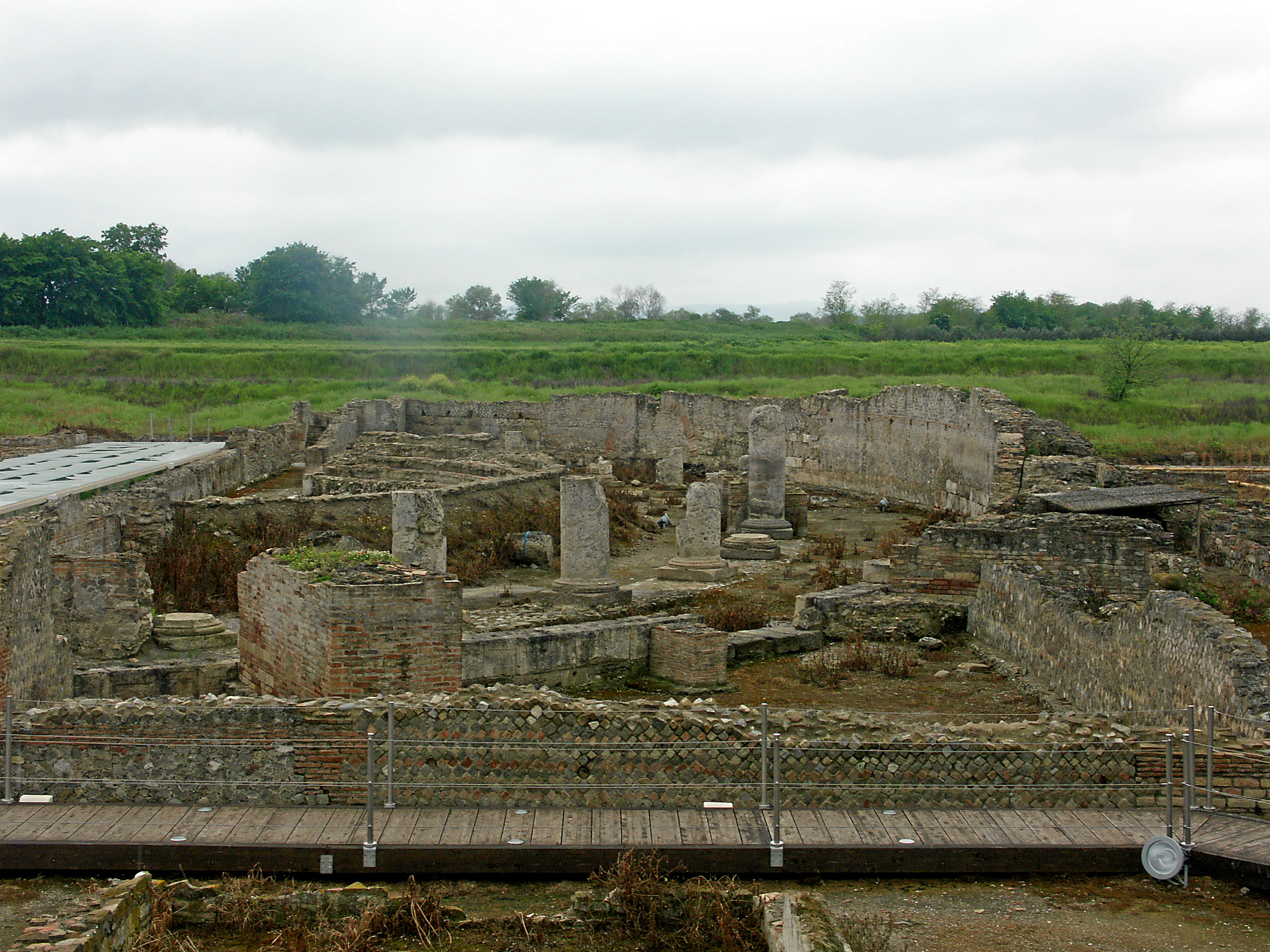
- Remains of the theatre of Sybaris

- Location within Italy
- 39°43′0″N 16°29′38″E
- Type: Settlement
- Periods: Archaic Greece to Classical Greece
- Location: Sibari, Province of Cosenza, Calabria, Italy
- Region: Magna Graecia

History
- Built: 720 BC
- Built by: Achaean and Troezenian colonists
- Abandoned: 445 BC

Site notes
- Area: Approximately 500 ha (1,200 acres)
- Excavation dates: 1960s
- Management: Soprintendenza per i Beni Archeologici della Calabria
- Website: ArcheoCalabriaVirtual (in Italian)

Sybaris (Ancient Greek: Σύβαρις; Italian: Sibari) was an important ancient Greek city situated on the coast of the Gulf of Taranto in modern Calabria, Italy.

The city was founded around 720 BC by Achaean and Troezenian settlers. Ten years later, Achaeans founded the nearby great city of Kroton. Sybaris amassed great wealth thanks to its fertile land and busy port so that it was known as the wealthiest colony of the Greek Archaic world. Its inhabitants became famous among the Greeks for their hedonism, feasts, and excesses, to the extent that "sybarite" and "sybaritic" have become bywords for opulence, luxury, and outrageous pleasure-seeking. Sybaris ruled smaller colonies throughout the area, and had an acropolis at Timpone della Motta near Francavilla Marittima about 10 km distant.

The city of Sybaris was destroyed in about 510 BC by its neighbour Kroton. Its population was driven out but its local colonies continued.

It was replaced by a new colony under Athenian leadership in 444/43 BC that became the city Thurii built partially on top of the older city. Thurii was destroyed in 193 BC but the Romans built the city of Copia on the same grid as Thurii. Parts of these cities are visible today.

The ruins of Sybaris/Thurii/Copia became forgotten as they were buried by sediment from the Crati river. The ruins were rediscovered and excavated from 1932. Today they can be found southeast of Sibari in the Province of Cosenza, Calabria, Italy.

== Geography ==
The city was situated close to the sea and lay between the Crathis and Sybaris rivers. Most modern research places the city on a coastal ridge near a wetland lagoon. The rivers are now known as the Crati and Coscile. Today the Coscile feeds into the Crati about 5 km from its mouth, which passes just south of the archaeological site of the city. When Sybaris was still populated the Coscile pursued a direct course into the Gulf of Taranto, probably at a short distance to the north.

The city lay on the widest plain in modern Calabria that was renowned for its fertility and the origin of the city's wealth.

The city lay close to sea level and the plain surrounded by the two rivers was subject to periodic flooding so that today Sybaris lies some 6 m below the surface and below groundwater level. A disastrous flood in 2013 filled the excavated site and covered it with silt. Even in 2023 powerful pumps are continuously needed to remove groundwater from the site.

== Name ==
Some ancient writers state that it took its name from the river Sybaris, which flows past it, while others derived it from the mythological creature Sybaris.

== History ==
=== Foundation ===
Sybaris was founded in 720 BC by Is [sic] of Helice, a city in Achaea in the northern Peloponnese. The Achaeans were accompanied by a number of Troezenians who were eventually expelled by the more numerous Achaeans. The Achaean colonisation was the second great migratory wave from Greece towards the West after that of the Euboeans, concentrating instead on the Ionian coast (Metapontum, Poseidonia, Sibaris, Kroton). The Achaeans were motivated, like others of the Greek colonisation, by the lack of cultivatable land in their mountainous region and by population pressure.

The authenticity of the name of the founder (oekist) is uncertain as Strabo is the only source and it might be a corruption of [Sagar]is or [Sybar]is. Further complicating the issue is the appearance of the letters Wiis on coins of Poseidonia. This has been interpreted as a confirmation of Strabo's account because Poseidonia is thought to be a colony of Sybaris.

=== Prosperity in the 7th and 6th century BC ===
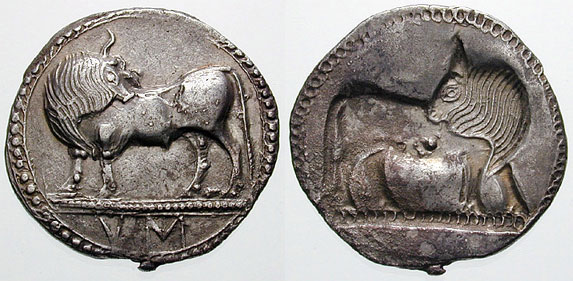
Noummos of Sybaris with characteristic bull symbol, c. 550–510 BC

Sybaris amassed great wealth and a huge population as a result of its fertile farming land and its policy of admitting aliens to its citizenry. It was the largest Greek city in Italy and may have had 300,000 inhabitants although others give a figure of 100,000. The circumference of the city was fifty stadia (over 6 miles (9.7 km)) and the area approximately 500 hectares (1,200 acres).

Sybaris was also a dominant power in the region and ruled over 4 tribes and 25 cities. Sybaris extended its dominion across the peninsula to the Tyrrhenian Sea, where it is thought to have founded its colonies Poseidonia, Laüs and Scidrus. Poseidonia was founded in approximately 600 BC, In the second half of the 7th century BC the Sybarites took over from the Oenotrians the sanctuary of Athena on the Timpone della Motta as their acropolis, located 15 km to the northwest, where they regularly celebrated large festivals.

Descriptions of the wealth and luxury of Sybaris are plentiful in the ancient literature. Smindyrides was a prominent citizen who is claimed by Herodotus to have surpassed all other men in refined luxury. Diodorus describes him as the wealthiest suitor for the daughter of Cleisthenes of Sicyon. He sailed from Sybaris to Sicyon in a ship of fifty oars manned by his own slaves and surpassed even Cleisthenes himself in luxury. Athenaeus makes the claim that his entourage consisted of a thousand slaves, fishermen, bird-catchers and cooks. However, his information must be false because he claims to cite Herodotus, who does not mention such a number. Claudius Aelianus even alleges that Smyndirides could not sleep on a bed of rose petals because it gave him blisters. Another Sybarite who is known by name is Alcimenes. A Pseudo-Aristotle mentions that it was said he dedicated a very expensive cloak as a votive offering at the temple of Lacinian Hera. Here Athenaeus distorts the information too: he treats the story as genuine rather than hearsay and attributes it to the real Aristotle.

Justin mentions an alliance of Sybaris with the other Achaean colonies Metapontum and Kroton against the Ionian colony Siris. This resulted in the conquest of Siris in the middle of the sixth century BC. In the second half of the sixth century BC Sybaris started minting its first coins, of which the oldest have been dated to approximately 530 BC. These coins employed the Achaean weight standard which was shared with the other Achaean colonies Kroton, Caulonia and Metapontum.

=== Ancient patent law ===
One of the first documented intellectual property laws similar to modern patent laws is thought to have been enacted in the 6th century BC in Sybaris, to protect culinary creations of chefs or bakers for a period of 1 year.

=== Subjugation by Kroton ===
Diodorus Siculus writes that the oligarchic government of the city was overthrown in 510/509 BC by a popular leader named Telys (Herodotus describes him as a tyrant). He persuaded the Sybarites to exile the 500 richest citizens and confiscate their wealth. The exiled citizens took refuge at the altars of Kroton. Telys demanded the Krotoniates return the exiles under threat of war. The Krotoniates were inclined to surrender the exiles to avoid war, but Pythagoras convinced them to protect the suppliants. As a consequence the Sybarites marched with 300,000 men upon the Krotoniates, whose army led by Milo numbered 100,000. The army sizes given by Diodorus (shared with Strabo) must have been even more exaggerated than the population size. Even though they were greatly outnumbered, the Krotoniates won the battle and took no prisoners, killing most of the Sybarites. After their victory they plundered and razed Sybaris. According to Strabo either two months or nine days elapsed between the battle and the sack. Most likely the Sybarites executed Telys and his supporters during this time.

Walter Burkert questions the veracity of the account given by Diodorus Siculus. It would have been illogical for Telys to banish his opponents first and then to demand their return. He argues that the elements of the story resemble fictional tragedies. The version of Herodotus is more brief and doesn't involve Pythagoras, but does claim that the Krotoniates received help from Dorieus.

Strabo claims that the Krotoniates diverted the course of the river Crathis to submerge Sybaris. The Crati transports coarse sand and pebbles in its channel and if Strabo's claim is true, that material would have been deposited as sediment above the city when the river submerged it. An analysis of core samples taken from the site did not find such river deposits directly above the former city, and the burial of Sybaris more likely resulted from natural processes such as fluvial overbank alluviation.

=== Continued struggle with Kroton ===
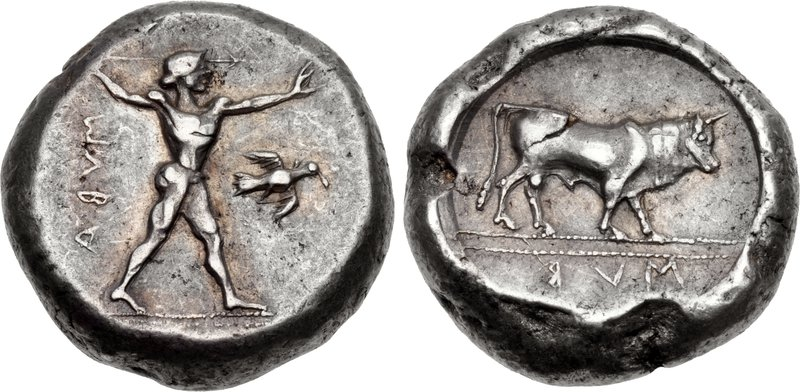
Noummos of Sybaris, c. 452–446 BC. Poseidon with a trident is on the obverse and the bull symbol on the reverse, suggesting a link with Poseidonia.

After its destruction the surviving inhabitants took refuge at their colonies Laüs and Scidrus. It is assumed some also fled to Poseidonia, because in the early fifth century Poseidonia's coins adopted the Achaean weight standard and the bull seen on Sybarite coins. A. J. Graham thinks it was plausible that the number of refugees was large enough for some kind of synoecism to have occurred between the Poseidonians and the Sybarites, possibly in the form of a sympolity. Sybaris was not completely destroyed, as Diodorus and Strabo claimed, but became a dependent "ally" of Kroton. "Alliance" coins show the tripod symbol of Kroton on one side and the bull symbol of Sybaris on the other side. Literary evidence from Aristoxenus attests of Pythagoreans who apparently moved to Sybaris after its subjugation by Kroton.

Diodorus Siculus mentions that Kroton besieged Sybaris again in 476/475 BC. The Sybarites appealed to the tyrant Hiero I of Syracuse for help. Hiero put his brother Polyzelos in command of an army to relieve the Sybarites, expecting that he would be killed by the Krotoniates. Polyzelos suspected this, refused to lead the campaign and took refuge with the tyrant Theron of Acragas. Diodorus makes no further mention of Hiero's plan to relieve Sybaris, indicating that the Sybarites were defeated again. However, according to Timaeus and two scholia Polyzelos was successful in relieving the siege of Sybaris and fled to Acragas later when he was accused of plotting revolution.

Regardless of the results of the siege of 476 BC, it seems the Sybarites had to leave their city at some point between that year and 452/451 BC. Diodorus writes that the Sybarites refounded their city at its former site in 452/451 BC under the leadership of a Thessalian. It is thought that Poseidonia had a major share in this because the coins of the new city have a great resemblance to those of Poseidonia. Possibly a treaty of friendship between Sybaris, its allies and the Serdaioi (an unknown people) dates to this new foundation, because Poseidonia was the guarantor of this treaty. Ultimately the Sybarites were again driven off by the Krotoniates from their new city in 446/445 BC.

=== Final expulsion in 445 BC ===
What happened next is again uncertain. According to Diodorus, the Sybarites requested Sparta and Athens to help them reoccupy their city. With the help of Athens and some other cities in the Peloponnese they founded the city of Thurii not far from the site of Sybaris. Soon a conflict arose between the Sybarites and the other colonists of Thurii over the privileges the Sybarites enjoyed. Practically all of the Sybarites were killed by the other colonists, who were more numerous and powerful. Some of the Sybarites managed to flee and founded Sybaris on the Traeis shortly after 444 BC.

The request for help from the Sybarites must have been made after the conclusion of the Thirty Years' Peace in the early spring of 445 BC, for it would not have made sense to ask for help while Sparta and Athens were still at war with each other. While Diodorus identifies only one expedition for the foundation of Thurii, Strabo writes that the Athenian and other Greek colonists first lived in Sybaris and only founded Thurii after the expulsion of the Sybarites. Modern scholarship corroborates Strabo's account and identifies two expeditions. In 446/445 BC Athens sent its expedition to reinforce the existing population of Sybaris. In the summer of 445 BC the collision between the two groups led to the downfall of the Sybarites. In 444/443 BC the Athenians and other new colonists then turned the city into a new foundation called Thurii. The city received a new democratic constitution which made provisions for ten tribes, but which did not include the Sybarites.

=== Legacy ===
Unlike Herodotus, Diodorus and earlier ancient Greek writers, later authors from the Roman period denounced the Sybarites. Aelianus, Strabo and especially Athenaeus saw the destruction of Sybaris as divine vengeance upon the Sybarites for their pride, arrogance, and excessive luxury. Athenaeus is the richest source for anecdotes about the Sybarites. According to him they invented the chamber pot and pioneered the concept of intellectual property to ensure that cooks could exclusively profit from their signature dishes for a whole year. They always travelled in chariots, but would still take three days for a journey of one day. The roads to villas in the countryside were roofed over and canals transported wine from vineyards to cellars near the sea. A fragment of the comedian Metagenes he quotes has a Sybarite boasting about literal rivers of food flowing through the city.

Not only does Athenaeus provide a great deal of examples to show the decadence of Sybarites, but he also argues that their excessive luxury and sins led to their doom. According to Athenaeus ambassadors of the Sybarites (one of whom was named Amyris) consulted the oracle of Delphi, who prophesied that war and internal conflict awaited them if they would honour man more than the gods. Later he cites Phylarchus, who wrote that the Sybarites invoked the anger of Hera when they murdered thirty ambassadors from Kroton and left them unburied. He also cites Herakleides as attributing the divine wrath to the murder of supporters of Telys on the altars of the gods. Herakleides supposedly mentioned that the Sybarites attempted to supplant the Olympic Games by attracting the athletes to their own public games with greater prizes. The most direct link between luxury and corruption is evident in Athenaeus' anecdote about the defeat of the Sybarites: to amuse themselves the Sybarite cavalrymen trained their horses to dance to flute music. When the Krotoniate army had their flute players make music the horses of the Sybarites ran over to the Krotoniates along with their riders. Strabo gives the "luxury and insolence" of the Sybarites as the reason for their defeat. Claudius Aelianus attributes the fall of Sybaris to its luxury and the murder of a lutenist at the altar of Hera.

Vanessa Gorman gives no credence to these accounts because grave sins followed by divine retribution were stock elements of fiction at the time. Furthermore, she and Robert Gorman point to Athenaeus as the origin of the embellished accounts rather than the historians he cited. He altered details of the original accounts, disguised his own contributions as those of past historians and invented new information to fit his argument that luxury leads to catastrophe. This concept was called tryphé and was a popular belief in his time, at the turn of the 2nd century AD. Peter Green likewise argues that these accounts are most likely the inventions of moralists. He points out the vast natural wealth of the city was the more likely reason it was attacked by Kroton.

This association of Sybaris with excessive luxury transferred to the English language, in which the words "sybarite" and "sybaritic" have become bywords for opulent luxury and outrageous pleasure seeking. One story, mentioned in Samuel Johnson's A Dictionary of the English Language, alludes to Aelianus' anecdote about Smindyrides. It mentions a Sybarite sleeping on a bed of rose petals, but unable to get to sleep because one of the petals was folded over.

== Archaeology ==
The location of the city which had been buried over time by more than 6 m of alluvial sediment from the Crati river was found only after a massive core drilling project from the early 1960s. It also lies below present groundwater level. It was also found that the later cities of Thurii and Copia were built partially above Sybaris.

Due to these reasons only a few parts of the city have been excavated: the Stombi quarter and minor test pits in the Parco del Cavallo area. On the latter site were found wonderfully decorated architectural elements from an as yet unidentified temple. The large number of finds from so small an area gives an idea of the magnificence of the city.

Other evidence about the city comes indirectly via the discovery of a sanctuary on the Timpone della Motta in nearby Francavilla Marittima where the highland site dominates the Crati river plain below.

== See also ==
- List of ancient Greek cities

== Notes ==
1. This article frequently makes use of Athenian archon years which were used by Diodorus Siculus, who is the most important primary source for information on Sybaris. These years ran from July to June.
2. The Greek text on the coins contains the archaic letter digamma. This letter is transliterated as "W" in English, but resembles the English letter "F", which is the reason why the text is also transliterated as Fiis. By about the eighth century BC, the letter digamma had disappeared in many Greek dialects, so Wiis would become Is because the two i's would be run together.

== Sources ==
=== Primary sources ===
- Aristotle (1932). Rackham, H. (ed.). Politics. Aristotle. Vol. 21. Cambridge, Massachusetts: Harvard University Press. ISBN 978-0-674-99291-7.
- Athenaeus (1854). Yonge, C. D. (ed.). The Deipnosophists; or, Banquet of the learned, of Athenaeus. Vol. 3. London: Henry G. Bohn.
- Claudius Aelianus (1665). Stanley, Thomas (ed.). Ælian his Various History. London: Thomas Dring.
- Diodorus Siculus (1939). Oldfather, C. H. (ed.). Library of History. Vol. 3. Cambridge, Massachusetts: Harvard University Press. ISBN 978-0-674-99375-4.
- ——— (2010). Green, Peter (ed.). Books 11-12.37.1: Greek History 480-431 B.C., the Alternative Version. Austin, Texas: University of Texas Press. ISBN 978-0-292-71277-5.
- Herodotus (1922). Godley, A. D. (ed.). The Persian Wars. Vol. 3. Cambridge, Massachusetts: Harvard University Press. ISBN 978-0-674-99133-0.
- Justin (1853). Watson, John Selby (ed.). Epitome of the Philippic History of Pompeius Trogus. London: Henry G. Bohn.
- Pseudo-Aristotle (1936). "On Marvellous Things Heard". In Hett, W. S. (ed.). Minor Works. Aristotle. Vol. 14. Cambridge, Massachusetts: Harvard University Press. ISBN 978-0-674-99338-9.
- Solinus (1895). Mommsen, Theodor (ed.). De mirabilibus mundi.
- Strabo (1924). Jones, H. L. (ed.). Geography. Vol. 3. Cambridge, Massachusetts: Harvard University Press. ISBN 978-0-674-99201-6.
- Varro (1934). "Res Rustica". In Hooper, W. D.; Ash, Harrison Boyd (eds.). On Agriculture. Cambridge, Massachusetts: Harvard University Press. ISBN 978-0-674-99313-6.

=== Secondary sources ===
- Burkert, Walter (1972). Lore and Science in Ancient Pythagoreanism. Harvard University Press. ISBN 978-0-674-53918-1.
- Cerchiai, Luca; Jannelli, Lorena; Longo, Fausto, eds. (2004). The Greek Cities of Magna Graecia and Sicily. Translated from Italian by the J. Paul Getty Trust. Los Angeles, California: Getty Publications. ISBN 978-0-89236-751-1.
- Gorman, Robert J.; Gorman, Vanessa B. (2007). "The Tryphê of the Sybarites: A Historiographical Problem in Athenaeus". The Journal of Hellenic Studies. 127: 38–60. doi:10.1017/S0075426900001609. S2CID 15569550.
- Gorman, Vanessa B. (2001). Miletos, the Ornament of Ionia: A History of the City to 400 B.C.E. Ann Arbor: University of Michigan Press. ISBN 978-0-472-11199-2.
- Graham, A. J. (1999). Colony and Mother City in Ancient Greece. Manchester, England: Manchester University Press. ISBN 978-0-7190-5739-7.
- Greco, Emanuele (2011). "On the Origin of the Western Greek Poleis" (PDF). Ancient West & East. 10. doi:10.2143/AWE.10.0.2141822.
- Hall, Jonathan M. (2008). "Foundation Stories". In Tsetskhladze, Gocha R. (ed.). Greek Colonisation: An Account of Greek Colonies and Other Settlements Overseas. Vol. 2. Leiden: Brill. pp. 383–426. ISBN 978-90-04-15576-3.
- Hansen, Mogens Herman (2004). "The Concept of the Consumption City Applied to the Greek Polis". In Nielsen, Thomas Heine (ed.). Once Again: Studies in the Ancient Greek Polis. Historia Einzelschriften. Vol. 180. Stuttgart: Franz Steiner Verlag. ISBN 978-3-515-08438-3.
- Johnson, Samuel (1830). Johnson's English Dictionary, as Improved by Todd and Abridged by Chalmers. Boston: Perkins and Marvin.
- Kleibrink, Marianne; Jacobsen, Jan Kindberg; Handberg, Søren (2004). "Water for Athena: Votive Gifts at Lagaria (Timpone della Motta, Francavilla Marittima, Calabria)" (PDF). World Archaeology. 36 (1): 43–67. doi:10.1080/0043824042000192669. JSTOR 4128302. S2CID 162707534.
- Lewis, David Malcolm (1992). "The Thirty Year's Peace". In Lewis, David Malcolm; Boardman, John (eds.). The Fifth Century B.C. The Cambridge Ancient History. Vol. 5. Cambridge, United Kingdom: Cambridge University Press. ISBN 978-0-521-23347-7.
- Papadopoulos, John K. (2002). "Minting Identity: Coinage, Ideology and the Economics of Colonization in Akhaina Magna Graecia". Cambridge Archaeological Journal. 12: 21–55. doi:10.1017/S0959774302000021. S2CID 162404730.
- Rhodes, P. J. (2006). A History of the Classical Greek World: 478–323 BC. Blackwell History of the Ancient World. Vol. 11. Blackwell Publishing. ISBN 978-0-631-22564-5.
- Rutter, N. K. (1970). "Sybaris—Legend and Reality". Greece and Rome. 17 (2): 168–176. doi:10.1017/S0017383500017836. JSTOR 642759. S2CID 163611919.
- Stanley, Jean-Daniel; Bernasconi, Maria Pia (2009). "Sybaris-Thuri-Copia trilogy: three delta coastal sites become land-locked". Méditerranée (112): 75–86. doi:10.4000/mediterranee.3190.
- Wilson, Nigel, ed. (2013). Encyclopedia of Ancient Greece. New York City, New York: Routledge. ISBN 978-1-136-78800-0.
- Wonder, John W. (2012). "The Italiote League: South Italian Alliances of the Fifth and Fourth Centuries BC". Classical Antiquity. 31 (1): 128–151. doi:10.1525/CA.2012.31.1.128.
- Zhmud, Leonid (2012). Pythagoras and the Early Pythagoreans. Oxford, United Kingdom: Oxford University Press. ISBN 978-0-19-928931-8.
