= Annales Siculi =

The Annales Siculi (Annals of Sicily) is an anonymous set of Latin annals covering the history of the island of Sicily between 1027 and 1265. Although it covers the entire period of Norman rule in Sicily and almost the entire period of Staufer rule, the Annales is not concerned with the kingdom of Sicily as a whole but only the island. It is least accurate for the earliest period, down to 1052, and is most substantial for the reigns of the Staufer kings Frederick II (1197–1250) and Manfred (1258–1266). It is conjectured to be the work of a monk, probably from the vicinity of Messina. The quality of the text's Latin is poor. It was probably composed sometime after the Angevin conquest of the kingdom in 1266.

The Annales is known from two manuscript copies of the 14th century, both probably copied from the original, now lost. They are:

- Palermo, Biblioteca della Società Siciliana per la Storia Patria, Fonda Fitalia, MS I.B.28, formerly catalogued as II.F.12. This is known as the Giarratana manuscript or Codice Giarratana, after its former owner, the marquis of Giarratana. The Annales is found on folios 29^{v}–31^{v}, immediately following the De rebus gestis Rogerii et Roberti of Geoffrey Malaterra. There is no break between the texts, but there is a short text of two paragraphs bridging them, which begins Post haec piissimus comes.
- Vatican City, Biblioteca Apostolica Vaticana, MS Vat. lat. 6206. The Annales is found on folios 298^{v}–300^{r}. It is set off from the preceding work, the Historia Sicula, by two blank lines.

The editio princeps (first edition) of the Annales was printed at Palermo in 1723 as part of the Bibliotheca Historica Regni Siciliae of Giovanni Battista Caruso. He ignored the break in the Vatican manuscript and treated the Annales and the stylistically distinct Historia as a unit. He also published the Annales separately with the short introduction Post haec piissimus comes under the title Appendix ex Codice Marchionis Farratanae ad ultimum capitulum Libri Quarti Historiae Gaufredi Malaterrae ("appendix from the codex of the marquis of Giarratana to the last chapter of the fourth book of the history of Geoffrey Malaterra"). As a result, the Annales is commonly known as the Appendix ad Malaterram, although that term is better applied only to the introductory text Post haec piissimus comes. This latter text is itself derived from the end of the Historia Sicula and covers the period from the death of Count Roger I of Sicily to the accession of Roger II. It has been characterized as a panegyric of the latter, but is not an integral part of the Annales.

== Editions ==
- Pertz, Georg, ed. "Annales Siculi". Monumenta Germaniae Historica, Scriptores 19 (Hanover, 1866): 494–500.

== Works cited ==
- Aspinwall, John; Metcalfe, Alex (2020). "Norman Identity and the Anonymous Historia Sicula" (PDF). In D. Booms; P. Higgs (eds.). Sicily: Heritage of the World. British Museum Publications. pp. 133–141.
- Lamboglia, Rosanna (2010). "Annales Siculi". In Graeme Dunphy (ed.). Encyclopedia of the Medieval Chronicle. Vol. 1: A–I. Brill. pp. 90–91.
- Stanton, Charles D. (2013). "Anonymus Vaticanus: Another Source for the Normans in the South?". Haskins Society Journal. 24: 79–94. doi:10.7722/j.ctt4cg6n4.9.
