= Hubert Houben (historian) =

German historian (born 1953)

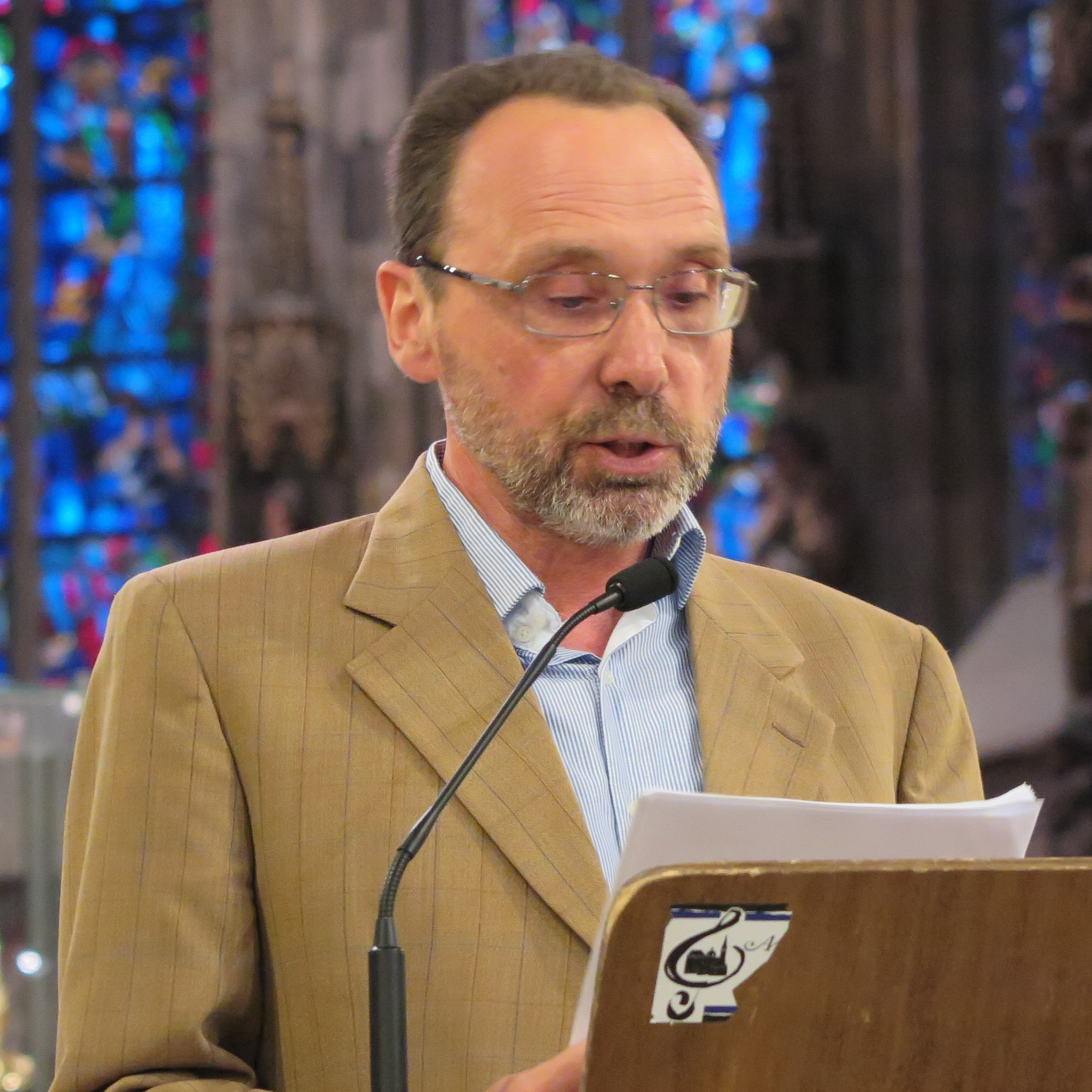
Hubert Houben, 2015

Hubert Houben (born 4 February 1953, in Heinsberg) is a German historian who specialized in the medieval history of Southern Italy. Living at Lecce since 1980, he acquired Italian citizenship in 1988.

He is corresponding member of the Accademia Pontaniana based in Naples (from 2006) and of the Society for the Study of the Crusades and the Latin East (SSCLE).

== Works ==
- Italian:
  - 2010: Federico II. Imperatore, uomo, mito, Il Mulino, ISBN 978-88-15-13338-0
  - 2003: Normanni fra Nord e Sud. Immigrazione e acculturazione nel Medioevo, Di Renzo Editore.
  - 1999: Ruggero II di Sicilia. Un sovrano tra Oriente e Occidente, Laterza.
  - 1996: Mezzogiorno normanno-svevo. Monasteri e castelli, ebrei e musulmani, Liguori.
  - 1989: Tra Roma e Palermo. Aspetti e momenti del Mezzogiorno medioevale, Congedo.
  - 1987: Medioevo monastico meridionale, Liguori.
  - 1984: Il libro del capitolo del monastero della Ss. Trinità di Venosa (Cod. Casin. 334), Congedo.
- English:
  - 2002: Roger II of Sicily: A Ruler Between East and West, ISBN 978-0-521-65573-6. ISBN 0-521-65573-0 [ ].
- German:
  - 2007: Kaiser Friedrich II. Kohlhammer, Stuttgart.
  - 1997: Roger II. von Sizilien. Herrscher zwischen Orient und Okzident. Wissenschaftliche Buchgesellschaft, Darmstadt. ISBN 3-89678-024-7 ISBN 978-3-89678-024-9.
