= John of Cicala =

John of Cicala (died 1216) was the bishop of Cefalù from 1195 until his death. He owed his rise to his family's alliance with the Staufer. Although he flirted with pro-papal politics in his early years, he was generally a close ally of the Staufer kings Henry VI and Frederick II. He was entrusted with a diplomatic mission to the Ayyubid Sultanate in 1213.

== Family and election ==
John was a younger son in the family of the lords of Castelcicala in the vicinity of Naples. His older brother was Paul of Cicala. His family supported the claims of Constance and her husband, Henry VI of Germany, to the throne of Sicily over those of Tancred of Lecce. They may have fought with the Germans at the siege of Naples in 1191. They certainly sided with Henry when he invaded the kingdom in 1194. Henry, in turn, pushed for the election of John as bishop as early as October 1194. In January 1195, following Henry's coronation as king of Sicily, John is recorded as bishop of Cefalù. He is significant as the first secular cleric in the see, whose bishops had thitherto been selected from the Augustinian canons who made up the cathedral chapter.

== Henry VI and the regency ==
John received royal privileges from Henry VI in January 1195 and from Constance in January 1196. In March 1196, royal official determined the boundary between his diocese and that of Syracuse. John maintained a close relationship with royal officials and the royal court, where he was present at Palermo in July 1197 and at Messina in September 1197. Following Henry's death, Constance and the young Frederick II stopped in Cefalù on the way to his coronation in Palermo. Constance gave the casalis of Odesver near Termini Imerese to the church of Cefalù and reconfirmed the diocese's privileges.

In October–November 1198, Pope Innocent III charged John with investigating some complaints against the archdiocese of Monreale. Early in 1200, he joined the regency council as a familiaris. With Archbishop Carus of Monreale, he opposed the policies of Walter of Palearia and Markward of Anweiler. In January 1201, he was encouraged in this stance by Innocent III. As early as March, however, he was being wooed by Markward's ally, Gilbert of Monteforte, who donated a mill to the abbey of San Giorgio a Gratteri, which belonged to the diocese of Cefalù. By June, he had swung over to Markward's side. Following Markward's death in 1202, John returned to the pro-papal position. He continued to be designated a familiaris until 1205, but played only a minor role in politics.

== Ally of Frederick II ==
In February 1205, John's brother Paul, who had become the count of Collesano and thus a neighbour of the diocese of Cefalù, granted to the church the castle of Roccella for the construction of a hospital for the poor of Cefalù. In April, John granted the hospital privileges. In 1209, John was investigated by papal judge delegates for the improper use of the castle of Cefalù, which belonged to the diocese. At the intervention of Frederick II, the case was dropped.

There are few indications of John's activities for the following years, but in 1213 he undertook a diplomatic mission of the highest importance. He was sent to Cairo and Damascus to negotiate with the Ayyubids in advance of the planned Fifth Crusade. Frederick's commissioning of John for this mission was the subject of the fifth in a series of five mosaics that once decorated the entrance porch of the cathedral of Cefalù. These mosaics, possibly effaced already by 1480, are known from a description in the Liber privilegiorum ecclesiae cephaludensis put together by Bishop Tommaso da Butera in 1329. The Latin inscription on the mosaic has Frederick telling John, "Go to Babylon [Cairo] and Damascus, look for Paladinus's sons, and audaciously speak my words." The Ayyubid sultan in 1213 was al-ʿĀdil, co-ruling in Egypt with his son al-Kāmil while his other son, al-Muʿaẓẓam, ruled in Damascus.

In 1215, Archbishop Berardo di Castagna of Palermo convinced Frederick II to have the porphyry sarcophagi of the Sicilian kings removed from the cathedral of Cefalù, where they had sat since the time of Roger II, to the cathedral of Palermo. This provoked a strong reaction from John, who was eventually compensated by the king with a large grant of territory to the bishopric.

In September 1215, John imposed new rules on the division of revenues of the cathedral chapter. In November, he set out for the Fourth Lateran Council to report on his mission to the Ayyubids. The last record of him alive is dated 7 January 1216. He died later that year.

== Bibliography ==
- Johns, Jeremy (2002). Arabic Administration in Norman Sicily: The Royal Dīwān. Cambridge University Press.
- Kamp, Norbert (1975). Kirche und Monarchie im staufischen Königreich Sizilien, 1: Prosopographische Grundlegung: Bistümer und Bischöfe des Königreichs 1194–1266, 3: Sizilien. Wilhelm Fink.
- Kamp, Norbert (1981). "Cicala, Giovanni di". Dizionario Biografico degli Italiani, Volume 25: Chinzer–Cirni (in Italian). Rome: Istituto dell'Enciclopedia Italiana. ISBN 978-8-81200032-6.
- Kamp, Norbert (2002). "The Bishops of Southern Italy in the Norman and Staufen Periods". In G. A. Loud; A. Metcalfe (eds.). The Society of Norman Italy. Brill. pp. 185–209.
- Lasareff, Victor (1935). "The Mosaics of Cefalù". The Art Bulletin. 17 (2): 184–232. doi:10.1080/00043079.1935.11409231.
- Takayama, Hiroshi (2010). "Frederick II's Crusade: An Example of Christian–Muslim Diplomacy". Mediterranean Historical Review. 25 (2): 169–185.

Catholic Church titles
Preceded by Benedict	Bishop of Cefalù; 1195–1216	Succeeded by Aldoin
