= Capaccio conspiracy =

1246 conspiracy and revolt against Frederick II in the Kingdom of Sicily

- Part of the Guelph–Ghibelline conflict and the struggle between Frederick II and Pope Innocent IV
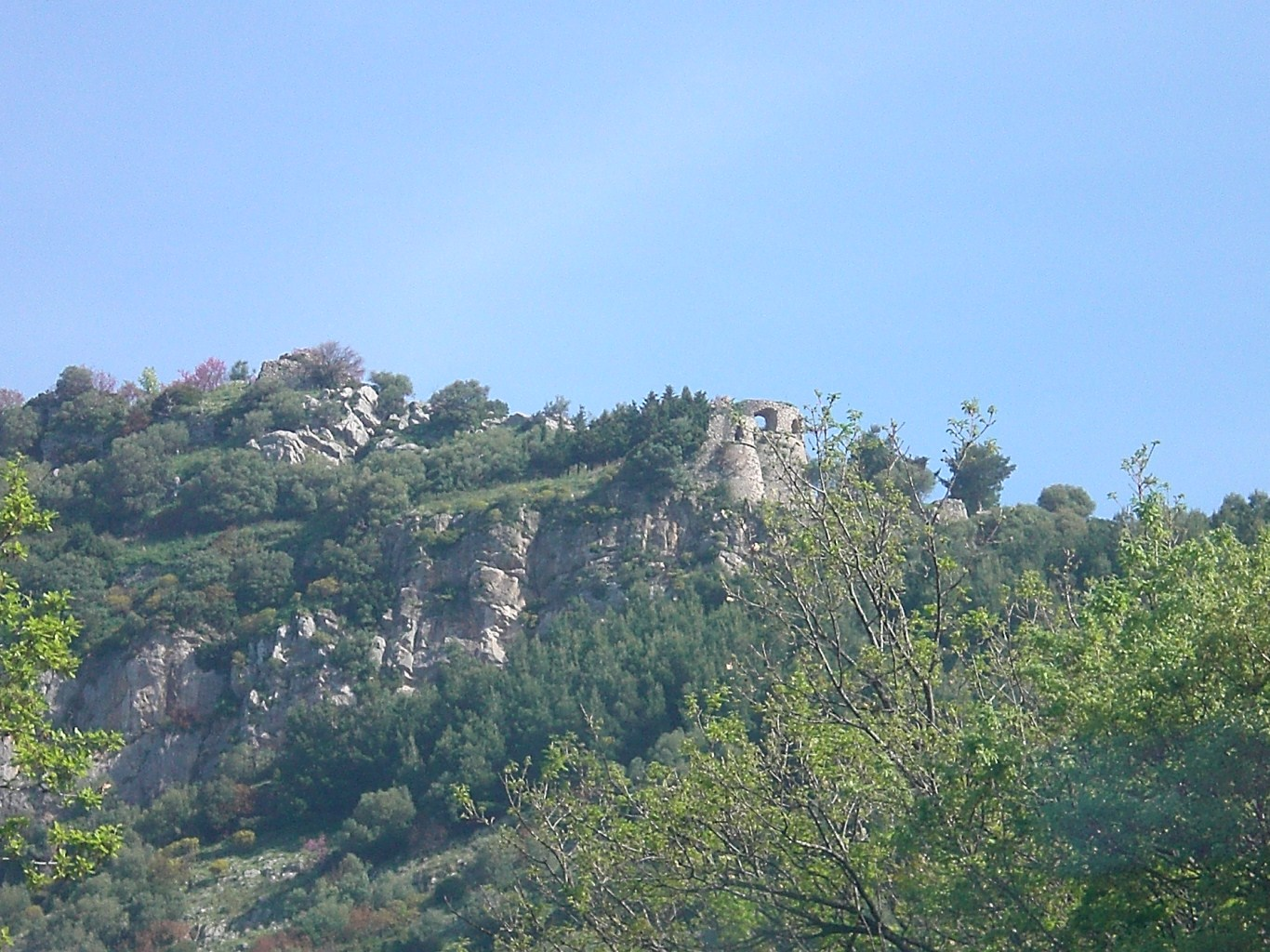
- Remains of the castle of Capaccio where the epilogue of the rebellion took place
Date	March – 17 July 1246
Location	Kingdom of Sicily, principally Campania and Terra di Lavoro
Result	Imperial–royal victory: Baronial revolt crushed and rebel strongholds recovered; Main rebels captured, executed or driven into papal exile

Belligerents
Imperial–royal regime Kingdom of Sicily: Loyal imperial-royal officials, garrisons and local contingents	Rebel barons and officials: Sanseverino family and other conspirators; Liberated Lombard prisoners; Supported by the papal party

Commanders and leaders
Frederick II; Riccardo Sanseverino, Count of Caserta: Imperial–royal officials, royal justiciars and provincial commanders	Tebaldo Francesco; Andrea di Cicala †; Tommaso Sanseverino, Count of Marsico ☠ Guglielmo Sanseverino ☠ Pandolfo di Fasanella; Giacomo di Morra

Strength
5,000–8,000: Royal troops, provincial levies, garrisons and loyal baronial contingents; Seven trebuchets employed at Capaccio	1,000–2,000 rebels and retainers: Distributed among several towns and fortified strongholds; 200–300 at Capaccio including more than 150 fighting men remaining at the final surrender

Casualties and losses
Few hundred killed and wounded	1,000-2,000 killed and wounded Hundreds captured: 150+ combatants captured at Capaccio; Numerous leaders and prisoners subsequently executed or mutilated; others escaped into papal territory

The Capaccio conspiracy was a plot and subsequent baronial revolt against Emperor Frederick II in the Kingdom of Sicily in 1246. The movement involved several members of Frederick's own administrative and military elite, including Tebaldo Francesco, Pandolfo di Fasanella, Giacomo di Morra and Andrea di Cicala, together with members of the Sanseverino family. Its original purpose appears to have included the assassination of Frederick and his son Enzo, followed by the overthrow of Hohenstaufen government in the kingdom. After the plot was discovered in March, some conspirators escaped into papal territory while others attempted to transform the conspiracy into an armed rebellion in southern Italy.

The revolt gained a temporary foothold in the Campanian interior, but failed to spread across the kingdom. The royal administration remained largely loyal, rebel-held towns and castles were rapidly isolated, and Frederick's arrival in the south accelerated their collapse. The final resistance centred on the mountain fortress of Capaccio, which surrendered on 17 July after a two-month siege. The affair occurred amid the wider confrontation between Frederick and Pope Innocent IV following Frederick's deposition at the First Council of Lyon in 1245. Papal authorities protected fugitives and subsequently encouraged resistance in the kingdom, although the extent of Innocent's involvement in the original assassination plot remains disputed. For Frederick personally, the conspiracy was especially traumatic because many of its participants were long-serving officials whom he had promoted and trusted, and the experience contributed to the increasingly severe and suspicious character of his government during his final years.

== Background ==
The conspiracy developed during one of the most dangerous phases of Frederick II's struggle with the papacy. Innocent IV had formally declared the emperor deposed at Lyon in July 1245 and thereafter encouraged resistance to Hohenstaufen government in Germany and Italy. By April 1246 a group of German ecclesiastical princes had elected Henry Raspe as rival King of the Romans, while in northern and central Italy the political cohesion of the imperial party had begun to show signs of strain. Frederick nevertheless continued to command extensive territories stretching from the Kingdom of Sicily through much of central and northern Italy, while the Regnum remained the principal financial, administrative and military foundation of his power.

Years of warfare had placed substantial demands upon the southern kingdom. Repeated collectae financed Frederick's armies in Lombardy and central Italy, while tighter regulation of commerce, monetary changes and continued military mobilisation generated dissatisfaction among sections of the nobility and population. The conspiracy, however, emerged chiefly from within the political elite rather than as a general popular tax rebellion. Several of its principal members had enjoyed important careers under Frederick. Tebaldo Francesco had served as podestà of Vicenza and Parma, rector of Padua, imperial vicar in the Trevisan March and marshal of the kingdom. Pandolfo di Fasanella had governed Tuscany as Frederick's vicar for six years, while Giacomo di Morra had served in Treviso and as captain-general in the Duchy of Spoleto. Andrea di Cicala had held major military and fiscal responsibilities in the Regnum.

Many of these men came from the Campanian interior, where papal influence from the neighbouring territories of the Church remained comparatively strong. Personal grievances, aristocratic opposition to the expansion of royal authority and anxiety over the seemingly interminable northern wars probably intersected. The precise origins of the assassination plan remain obscure. An imperial-friendly tradition placed its discovery as early as 1245, but most surviving accounts associate the decisive warning with Riccardo Sanseverino, Count of Caserta, whose messenger reached Frederick while the emperor was residing at Grosseto in March 1246.

== Conspiracy and rebellion ==
The warning revealed a plan directed against Frederick and Enzo and apparently intended to precipitate a broader political overthrow in the Kingdom of Sicily. Pandolfo di Fasanella and Giacomo di Morra, both then close to the imperial court, fled rapidly to Rome once they learned that the plot had been exposed. They were received under papal protection. Tebaldo Francesco instead returned south and joined the Sanseverino faction in the Campanian interior. Andrea di Cicala, who commanded royal defences in the region, defected and caused several castles to admit the conspirators, providing them with a network of fortified bases. The rebels also released several dozen Lombard prisoners held since the northern campaigns, some of whom took up arms against their former captors.

For several weeks the situation remained uncertain. Rumours that Frederick had already been killed encouraged defections in parts of the Campanian interior, and the rebels occupied or controlled fortified positions including Altavilla, Sala and Capaccio. The expected general rising nevertheless failed to occur. Naples, Salerno and the other major centres remained obedient, while the imperial–royal administrative structure continued to function. Local officials and loyal forces contained the rebellion even before Frederick's arrival, surrounding insurgent centres and preventing the revolt from spreading. Once it became known that the emperor remained alive, many who had joined the rising returned to royal obedience.

Innocent IV openly encouraged the continuation of resistance after the conspiracy had been uncovered. Papal letters urged the inhabitants of the kingdom, the Romans and northern Italian allies to assist the rebels, and the curia considered military intervention in the Regnum. No effective relief army materialised. A papal attempt to exploit the crisis farther north also failed when forces associated with Cardinal Raniero Capocci were defeated near Spello by the imperial army of Marino da Eboli. By 25 April Frederick had reached Salerno and could report that most rebel centres had been recovered. Andrea di Cicala died in May in circumstances connected with the conflict, while Tommaso and Guglielmo Sanseverino were captured and executed. Sala was reduced rapidly, leaving the castle of Capaccio as the principal surviving centre of resistance.

=== Siege of Capaccio ===
Capaccio occupied a naturally formidable position on a rocky height in the hinterland of Paestum. A direct storming of the fortress promised heavy losses, and the royal army instead adopted a systematic blockade. The castle was surrounded, seven trebuchets were constructed to bombard its defences, and the conduits supplying it with water were severed. Hunger, thirst and sustained bombardment gradually exhausted the defenders. After approximately two months, Tebaldo Francesco and the remaining garrison surrendered on 17 July 1246.

More than 150 fighting men remained in the fortress at its fall. The surrender extinguished the last major armed centre associated with the conspiracy and restored effective royal control throughout the mainland kingdom.

== Aftermath ==
The suppression was followed by exemplary punishment on an exceptional scale. The prisoners taken at Capaccio were mutilated, blinded or executed by a variety of methods, while Tebaldo Francesco and five others were deliberately preserved alive after mutilation and exhibited through the kingdom as warnings against treason. Tebaldo died in September. Frederick's chancery distributed accounts of the conspiracy and its suppression throughout Italy and to the courts of Europe, presenting his survival and the failure of the revolt as evidence of both the loyalty of the majority of his subjects and divine protection of his rule.

The affair left a deeper personal mark on Frederick than the military danger alone would suggest. Several conspirators had served him for many years and had received extensive offices and honours from him; he consequently interpreted their actions as a violation not merely of political fidelity but of relationships approaching those between father and sons. His experience of betrayal contributed to a marked intensification of suspicion at court and to a growing preference for entrusting major commands and governments to his sons, sons-in-law and other dynastic relatives.

Politically, however, the rebellion demonstrated the resilience of Hohenstaufen government around Frederick, especially in the Kingdom of Sicily. The expected mass rising had failed, the large cities remained loyal, and provincial officials and local forces had contained much of the insurrection before Frederick personally reached the main theatre. In the autumn of 1246 Frederick reorganised the kingdom's central and provincial administration, restoring a single senior judicial authority and revising the responsibilities of provincial officials. Thereafter the Regnum remained the dependable foundation of his political and military power and his secure base during subsequent crises. The failure of Capaccio also exposed the limits of papal support within southern Italy: Innocent IV could encourage rebellion and contemplate invasion, but he had been unable to convert dissatisfaction into the destruction of Frederick's rule.

== Sources ==
- Abulafia, David (1988). Frederick II: A Medieval Emperor. London: Allen Lane. ISBN 9780713990041.
- Grillo, Paolo (2023). Federico II: La guerra, le città e l'Impero. Milan: Mondadori. ISBN 978-88-04-76912-5.
- Stürner, Wolfgang (2000). Friedrich II. Teil 2: Der Kaiser 1220–1250. Darmstadt: Primus Verlag. ISBN 978-3-534-12229-5.
- Van Cleve, Thomas Curtis (1972). The Emperor Frederick II of Hohenstaufen: Immutator Mundi. Oxford: Clarendon Press.
