= Francavilla Marittima =

- Comune
- Comune di Francavilla Marittima
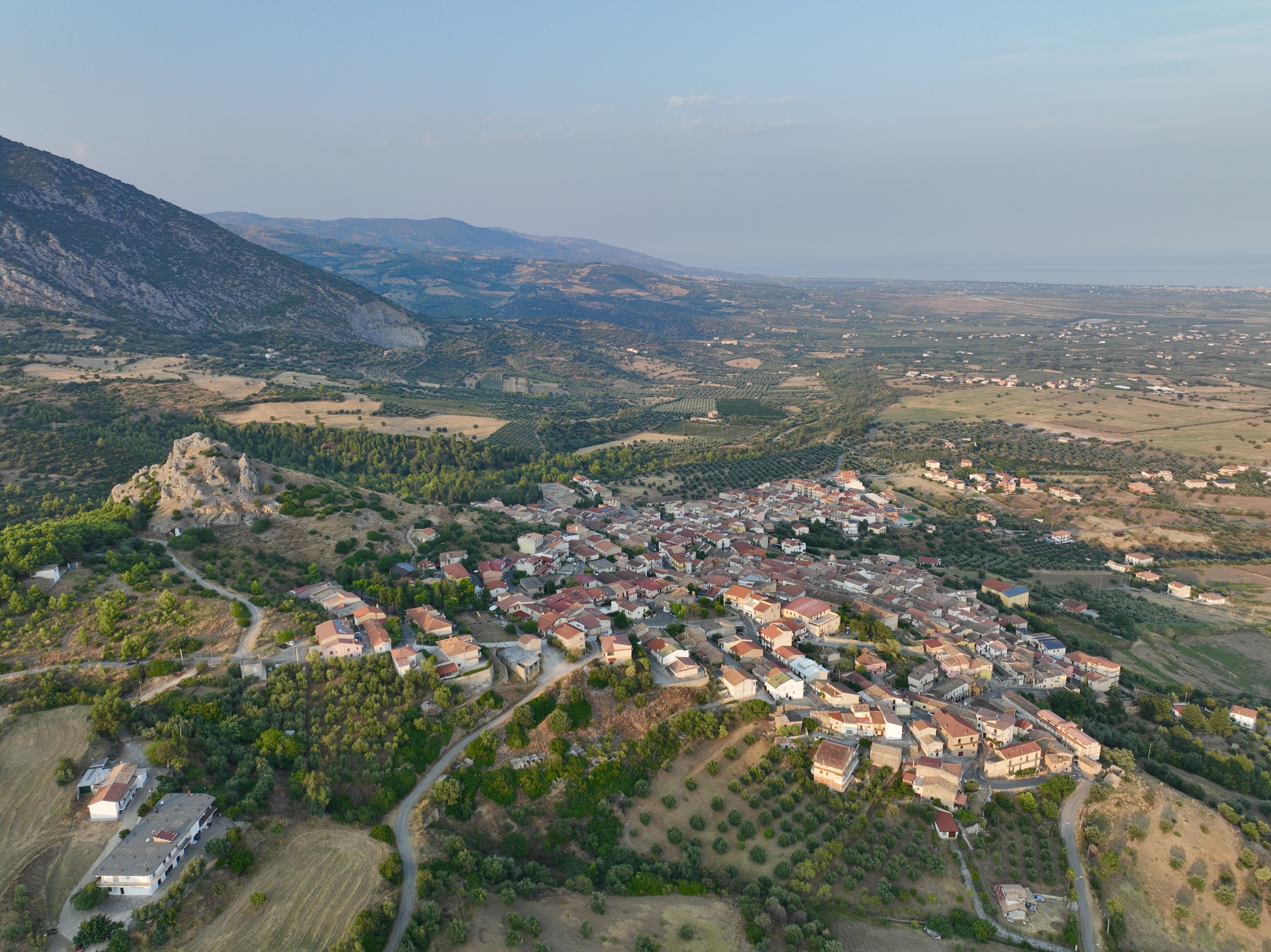
- Aerial view of Francavilla Marittima

- Location within Italy Location within Calabria
- Coordinates: 39°49′1″N 16°23′44″E
- Country: Italy
- Region: Calabria
- Province: Cosenza (CS)

Government
  - Mayor: Franco Bettarini

Area
  - Total: 33.02 km^{2} (12.75 sq mi)
- Elevation: 273 m (896 ft)

Population (31 August 2017)
  - Total: 2,870
  - Density: 86.9/km^{2} (225/sq mi)
- Demonym: Francavillesi of Francavillari
- Time zone: UTC+1 (CET)
  - Summer (DST): UTC+2 (CEST)
- Postal code: 87072
- Dialing code: 0981
- Patron saint: St. Cajetan
- Saint day: 7 August
- Website: Official website

Francavilla Marittima is a town and comune in the province of Cosenza in the Calabria region of southern Italy. It is known for the Timpone della Motta, a hill which was the site of an Oenotrian and ancient Greek settlement and sanctuary.
