= War of the Keys =

13th-century Italian conflict

Date	1228–1230
Location	Central and southern Italy
Result	Treaty of San Germano: Imperial victory

Belligerents
Papal States: Lombard League	Kingdom of Sicily: Sixth Crusade

Commanders and leaders
Pope Gregory IX: Pandulf of Anagni; John of Brienne; Giovanni Colonna; Pelagius of Albano	Emperor Frederick II: Rainald of Urslingen; Henry of Morra

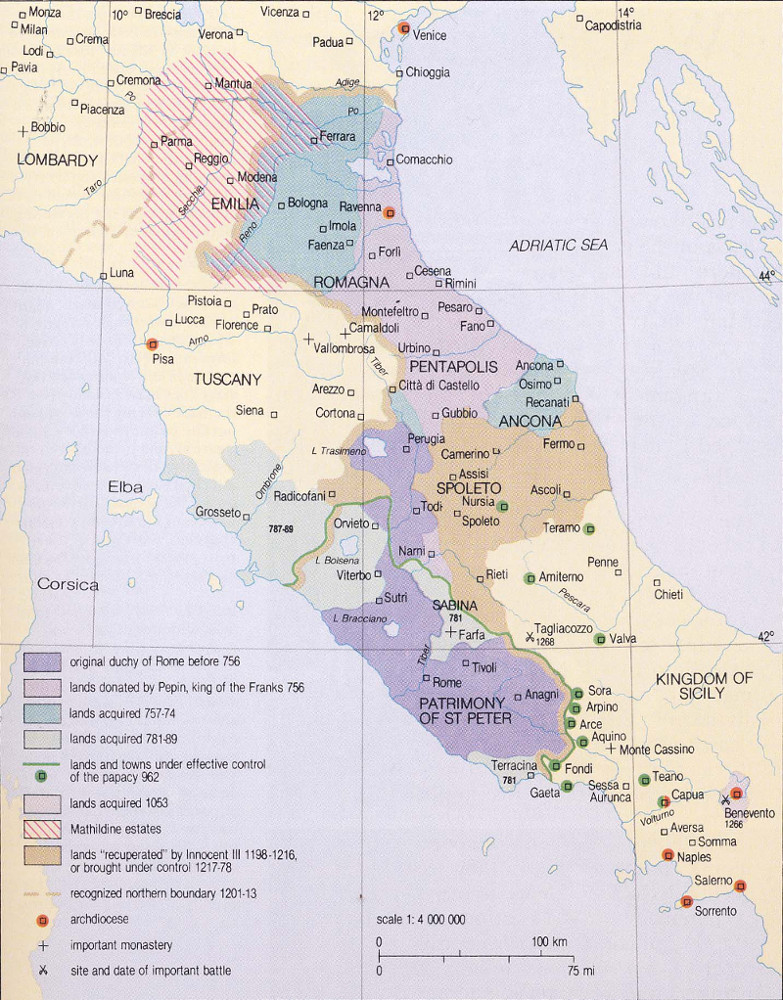
Map of central Italy, showing Lombardy, the Papal States and the Kingdom of Sicily

The War of the Keys (1228–1230) was the first military conflict between Frederick II, Holy Roman Emperor, and the Papacy. Fighting took place in central and southern Italy. The Papacy made strong gains at first, securing the Papal States and invading the Kingdom of Sicily, while Frederick was away on the Sixth Crusade. Upon his return, he defeated the papal forces, forcing Pope Gregory IX to begin peace talks. After drawn-out negotiations, the treaty of San Germano terminated the conflict with no territorial changes.

The causes of the conflict lay in conflicting papal and imperial claims in central Italy, Frederick's failure to fulfill his agreement to lead a crusade on schedule and his supposed mistreatment of the Sicilian church. The emperor was excommunicated before he left on his crusade in June 1228. His representatives, with or without his permission, entered territory claimed by the Papacy and Gregory responded with war. His aim was to take Sicily, which was a fief of the church, back from Frederick.

Gregory raised troops and funds internationally, from as far afield as Portugal and Sweden. He sent two armies under the command of John of Brienne into the disputed territory in late 1228 and another army into the Kingdom of Sicily in January 1229. The war was going in his favour as late as May, but he was running low on funds and troops. The strategy of denying the ports to Frederick failed. The return of the emperor in June quashed the rumours spread by papal agents that he was dead and caused a rapid reversal of fortunes. The sieges of Sulmona and Capua were lifted by September and by October most of the kingdom had been recovered. Negotiations were opened in November and the active phase of the war ended.

== Principal sources ==
The principal sources on the war are in Latin. The Chronica of Richard of San Germano, which has a pro-imperial stance, is one of the most important narrative sources. The biography of Gregory IX in the Liber censuum provides a valuable pro-papal narrative. Other important chronicles are Roger of Wendover's Chronica sive flores historiarum and the Chronicon of Aubry of Troisfontaines. From a crusader perspective the war is covered in the Colbert–Fontainebleau Eracles and the Chronicle of Ernoul and Bernard the Treasurer.

There are three north Italian chronicles that cover the war from the contrasting perspectives of the pro-papal Guelphs and pro-imperial Ghibellines. From the Guelph perspective are the contemporary Annales placentini guelfi of Giovanni Codagnello and the Chronicon faventinum, while the Ghibelline perspective is represented in the slightly later Annales placentini gibellini. Even the Guelph chronicles, however, do not exactly toe the papal line. They generally view the war as the fault of Frederick for refusing to respect papal territory, but do not blame the emperor for delaying his crusade.

The most important documentary source is the register of Gregory's letter's, which are edited in the Monumenta Germaniae Historica. Letters to and from Frederick also survive, including two of his that were copied into an Arabic chronicle, the Taʾrīkh al-Manṣūrī of Ibn Naẓīf al-Ḥamawī. For the peace negotiations, the letters to and from Cardinal Thomas of Capua are a critical source.

An important source for contemporary critical attitudes towards the pope's war is the work of the troubadours, lyric poets writing in Old Occitan.

== Background and causes ==
The main points of contention between Frederick and the Papacy were the crusade and the Papal States. Frederick had vowed several times in public ceremonies to lead a crusade to the Holy Land on pain of excommunication. Yet Pope Honorius III had granted him many delays. Frederick finally sailed from Apulia in August 1227, but almost immediately turned back, claiming illness. Gregory IX was not prepared to accept another delay. He accused Frederick of faking his illness (although the Guelph annals accept the excuse). On 10 October 1227, Gregory excommunicated Frederick. The Annales placentini guelfi identifies the harm Frederick's delay caused the crusaders who had gathered in Apulia as one of the causes of the war.

In March 1228, Gregory renewed the excommunication and ordered Frederick to stop attending religious services. Otherwise, Gregory would absolve his subjects of their oaths of fealty to him and confiscate the Kingdom of Sicily, which was a papal fief since 1059. The popes also claimed that the march of Ancona and duchy of Spoleto belonged to them, but Frederick refused to relinquish imperial control. He appointed Rainald of Urslingen as duke of Spoleto.

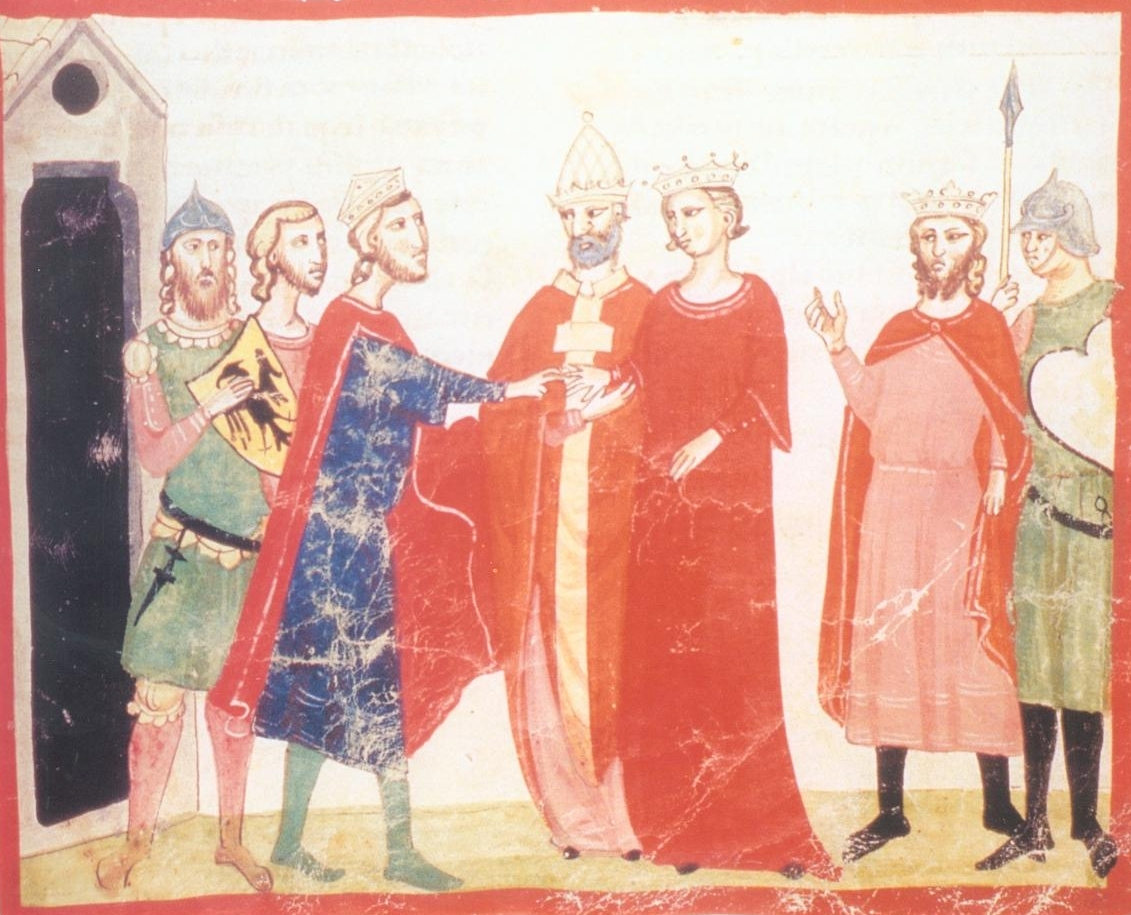
Marriage of Frederick and Isabella, with John of Brienne standing off to the right. From a copy of the 14th-century Nuova Cronica.

In November 1225, Frederick II had married the thirteen-year-old queen Isabella II of Jerusalem, thus depriving her father, John of Brienne, of the regency. Although John refused an offer to lead the Lombard League in its rebellion against Frederick while Isabella was alive, the queen died in May 1228. Still excommunicated, Frederick II left on the Sixth Crusade at the end of June. Gregory did not recognize the expedition as a crusade. With no reason any longer to keep on good terms with Frederick, John accepted command of the papal army preparing to invade Sicily. The absence of the emperor on crusade provided the perfect opportunity and, in August, Gregory released both Frederick's imperial and Sicilian subjects from their oaths of obedience. Gregory intended to replace Frederick as emperor. Although Frederick believed that Gregory also wanted to replace him on the Sicilian throne with one of his pliable young sons, the pope intended to dissolve the kingdom and rule it directly through papal governors.

The war against Frederick began while he was still in the east. In March 1229, he signed a treaty with the Ayyubid sultan al-Kāmil by which he took control of Jerusalem and brought his crusade to a successful conclusion. In July, Gregory published an encyclical denouncing the treaty and Frederick as un-Christian.

== Papal war planning ==
Gregory's call for support, both in men and money, was international. He issued a bulletin to his legates and commanders on 1 December 1228 detailing his plans for raising troops and funds.

=== Forces ===
Sources generally refer to the pope's forces as the "papal army" or "army of the lord pope". Gregory himself called it the "army of the church" (exercitus ecclesie) and in one instance the "army of Christ". Richard of San Germano describes the papal army as "enemies bearing the sign of the keys" (clavigeros hostes) and clavesignati ('key-signed'), a play on crucesignati (cross-signed), which was the common term for crusaders. These are references to the insignia of the keys that appeared on the papal banners. The keys were also apparently sewn onto clothing over the breast in imitation of the cross borne by crusaders. The conventional name "War of the Keys" is a reference to this insignia. It has been favoured by scholars "because it embodies the quasi-crusade status of the campaign".

The papal army contained both knights and infantry. It was mostly raised in the Papal States and in Tuscany. These, however, could not supply a large enough army for Gregory's purposes, and so he sought to raise troops abroad. He sent requests throughout the Holy Roman Empire: to the German princes, to the Lombard League and to the Republic of Genoa. He also came to employ many mercenaries from France, England and Spain. Bishops Milo of Beauvais and Hugh of Clermont brought troops from France. That a few Germans heeded the pope's call is known from the fact that Frederick later pardoned them. Gregory was still trying to raise troops as late as June 1229, when he asked the infante Peter of Portugal to bring knights to Italy to fight Frederick. The army of 1228 was deployed in three units against Ancona, Spoleto and the Campania. On 21 December 1228, when Gregory wrote to King Eric XI of Sweden requesting financial aid, he confirmed that his forces were already divided into three armies.

The papal commanders were John of Brienne, Cardinal Giovanni Colonna, Cardinal Pelagius of Albano and the papal chaplain Pandulf of Anagni, acting as papal legate. John is sometimes seen as the overall commander of the papal forces, but this is not clear from the sources. He was joined by his nephew, Walter IV of Brienne, who claimed the principality of Taranto and the county of Lecce in the Kingdom of Sicily. His northern army facing Ancona had the more urgent task, but the southern army facing Sicily under Pandulf seems to have been the main force. The southern army was drawn mainly from the Papal States. It also contained many Sicilian exiles and was even captained by two, counts Thomas of Molise and Roger of Aquila. These two armies are easily identified through the sources. They are the second and third, but of the first army mentioned by the pope no details or names of commanders have come down.

=== Finances ===
The bulletin of 1 December 1228 contains the earliest reference to papal fundraising for a war against Christians. Since Gregory did not initially call a crusade against Frederick, he could not offer indulgences to those who took part in the war or gave money. The use of direct taxation to fund a papal army was a "first of its kind". He levied tithes, the so-called "crusade tenth", from France, England, Wales, Scotland, Ireland, Denmark, Sweden, northern Italy and eastern Europe. In France, the remainder of a five-year levy first collected in 1225 for the Albigensian Crusade of 1226 was set aside for the new war after the crusade ended with the treaty of Paris in April 1229. In total, about 100,000 livres tournois were received from France. The tithe was successfully collected in northern Italy and eastern Europe, possibly in Sweden, but not in England or Scotland.

According to Roger of Wendover, the tithe was strongly resisted in England. He says that the pope levied the tithe on all the "moveable property" in the kingdom, both secular and ecclesiastical. Stephen of Anagni was named collector (and possibly legate) for England, Scotland and Ireland on 23 December 1228. King Henry III of England called an assembly of the realm for April 1229 at which Stephen read out the papal letters. There were public protests against the exactions. When it became clear that Henry III would not interfere with Stephen's mission, the higher nobility simply refused to pay. According to Roger, Gregory rewarded Henry by blocking the election of Walter d'Eynsham as archbishop of Canterbury. To meet the pope's demands, many prelates pawned their plate and their vestments, fearing Stephen's power to excommunicate nonpayors or those who defrauded the Holy See. Stephen was also empowered to demand that clergy swear oaths on the Gospels that they had paid their share and to affix their seals to the records of payment. According to William of Andres, the total collected in England was 60,000 marks. Gregory was still waiting for it in June 1229. There was also resistance to the tithe in Scotland. According to the Scotichronicon, when Stephen attempted to execute his commission in Scotland in early 1229, he was denied entry by King Alexander II.

=== Lombard League ===
The north Italian cities of the Lombard League were Gregory's most natural allies against Frederick. Records of the deliberations of the rectors of the league concerning the War of the Keys do not survive. Examples of such deliberations, however, do appear in the Dictamina rhetorica of Guido Faba of Bologna, composed around 1230. They likely reflect actual debates. The rectors met with the pope in September 1228 and agreed to supply troops to defend the church.

The troops sent were not as many as Gregory had requested or perhaps as they had promised, nor as fast. If the details in the Dictamina rhetorica are accurate, the league promised 500 knights by January 1229. In February 1229, Gregory renewed his appeal through the legate Goffredo of San Marco. The Annales placentini guelfi confirms that the troops were delayed. According to the Annales placentini gibellini, the cities collectively supplied 300 knights to Giovanni Colonna. The specific contributions of two cities are known. The Annales placentini guelfi records the late arrival of 36 from Piacenza in March 1229 and the Chronicon faventinum records that Faenza contributed 27 knights. Nevertheless, Gregory complained that the league's troops were deficient in money, weapons and horses. He was still demanding the fulfillment of the league's obligations in May 1229.

The Annales placentini gibellini records that the north Italian troops began returning home after learning of Frederick's landing at Brindisi in June 1229. This is confirmed by a letter of Gregory's of 26 June. The pope also confirmed shortfalls in their wages. On 13 July, Gregory demanded three more months of service from those troops that had already arrived. He also demanded reinforcements and money under pain of excommunication. He forwarded to the rectors the dispatches of John of Brienne and Giovanni Colonna, sealed with the papal bull, to demonstrate the army's desperation. The Lombard cities, however, were by then distracted by their own civil war, which culminated in the battle of San Cesario in August 1229.

=== Germany ===
Gregory IX sought to depose Frederick II as Holy Roman Emperor and engineer the election of a new emperor. Roger of Wendover records that the pope sent letters to the German princes to justify that Frederick "be cast down from the imperial dignity". He cites a letter to Duke Leopold VI of Austria dated 18 July 1229. These plans had to be abandoned, however, when among the German princes only Duke Louis I of Bavaria showed any interest in going to such an extreme.

The pope's efforts to turn the kingdom of Germany against the emperor yielded few results. He made serious efforts to lure Duke Otto I of Lüneburg, to no avail. In 1228, Frederick II's son, King Henry (VII) of Germany, repudiated the tutelage of Duke Louis of Bavaria and took direct control of the government of Germany. In 1229, he invaded Bavaria to force Louis to swear an oath of loyalty. Louis complied under duress. Although Gregory's overtures in Germany were counterproductive in the near term, in the long term they effected a breakdown in relations between the crown and the princes.

== War ==
=== Ancona and Spoleto ===
Just before departing from Brindisi on his crusade, Frederick named Rainald as his bailiff (regent) in Sicily and as imperial vicar in the disputed territories in central Italy. Rainald and his brother Berthold of Urslingen led armed forces into the duchy of Spoleto in August 1228. Rainald claimed merely to be pursuing certain rebels from Sicily, as he had been charged by Frederick. Gregory did not accept this explanation. Frederick later claimed that Rainald had exceeded his instructions and had been forbidden to enter papal territory.

In September, Azzo VII of Este, the papal rector in the march of Ancona, requested permission to abandon his position as Rainald prepared to continue his advance into the march. Ultimately, he chose to remain neutral. In October, Rainald invaded the march, going as far as Macerata, while Berthold remained in Spoleto. Rainald's army included a Muslim contingent. He laid siege to Capitignano and destroyed Popleto, the lords of which were in rebellion. His capture of Foligno, not far from where the pope was staying at Perugia, particularly inflamed tensions. He also expelled the Franciscans from the Kingdom of Sicily on the grounds that they were acting as papal messengers. In November 1228, Gregory excommunicated Rainald and Berthold.

A papal army under John of Brienne and Giovanni Colonna expelled the imperial army from Ancona and Spoleto between late 1228 and the spring of 1229. In early 1229, Rainald bought the support of four towns in the march of Ancona by issuing privileges to Osimo, San Ginesio, Ripatransone and Recanati. He was ultimately forced back on Sulmona, where he was besieged.

John of Brienne briefly left the siege in April in order to conclude at Perugia with representatives from the Latin Empire of Constantinople a treaty whereby he would become emperor for life on behalf of his daughter, Mary, wife of the Emperor Baldwin II. The treaty was confirmed by the pope on 9 April and John then returned to the siege of Sulmona. His acquisition of an imperial title, or at least a garbled report of it, seems to have sparked rumours that he was looking to supplant Frederick as Holy Roman Emperor.

=== Papal invasion of the Kingdom of Sicily ===
On 18 January 1229, the papal army under Pandulf crossed the frontier into the Kingdom of Sicily. Richard of San Germano presents this invasion as primarily designed to draw Rainald out of central Italy. Pandulf had to fight his way across the bridge at Ceprano, but the castle of Ponte Solarato under the command of Adenolfo Balzano quickly surrendered. The initial Sicilian defence was weak. San Giovanni Incarico under Bartholomew of Supino and Pastena under Robert of Aquila quickly capitulated, but John of Poli successfully defended Fondi and Pandulf pulled back to Ceprano.

After these initial losses, the Sicilian army commanded by the chief justiciar, Henry of Morra, put up stiff resistance for two months. Pandulf attacked Rocca d'Arce, which was effectively defended by Rao of Azzia. After burning the countryside, he retreated to Ceprano. The fighting in the Liri Valley picked up in mid-March. Papal mercenaries invaded the Terra Sancti Benedicti, the territory of the abbey of Monte Cassino, capturing Piedimonte and meeting little resistance. The defenders pulled back to San Germano, while many inhabitants fled. The castles of Monumito, Piumarola and Terame were razed by papal troops. The advance towards San Germano was held up at Sant'Angelo in Theodice, which was defended by crossbowmen under Roger of Galluccio.

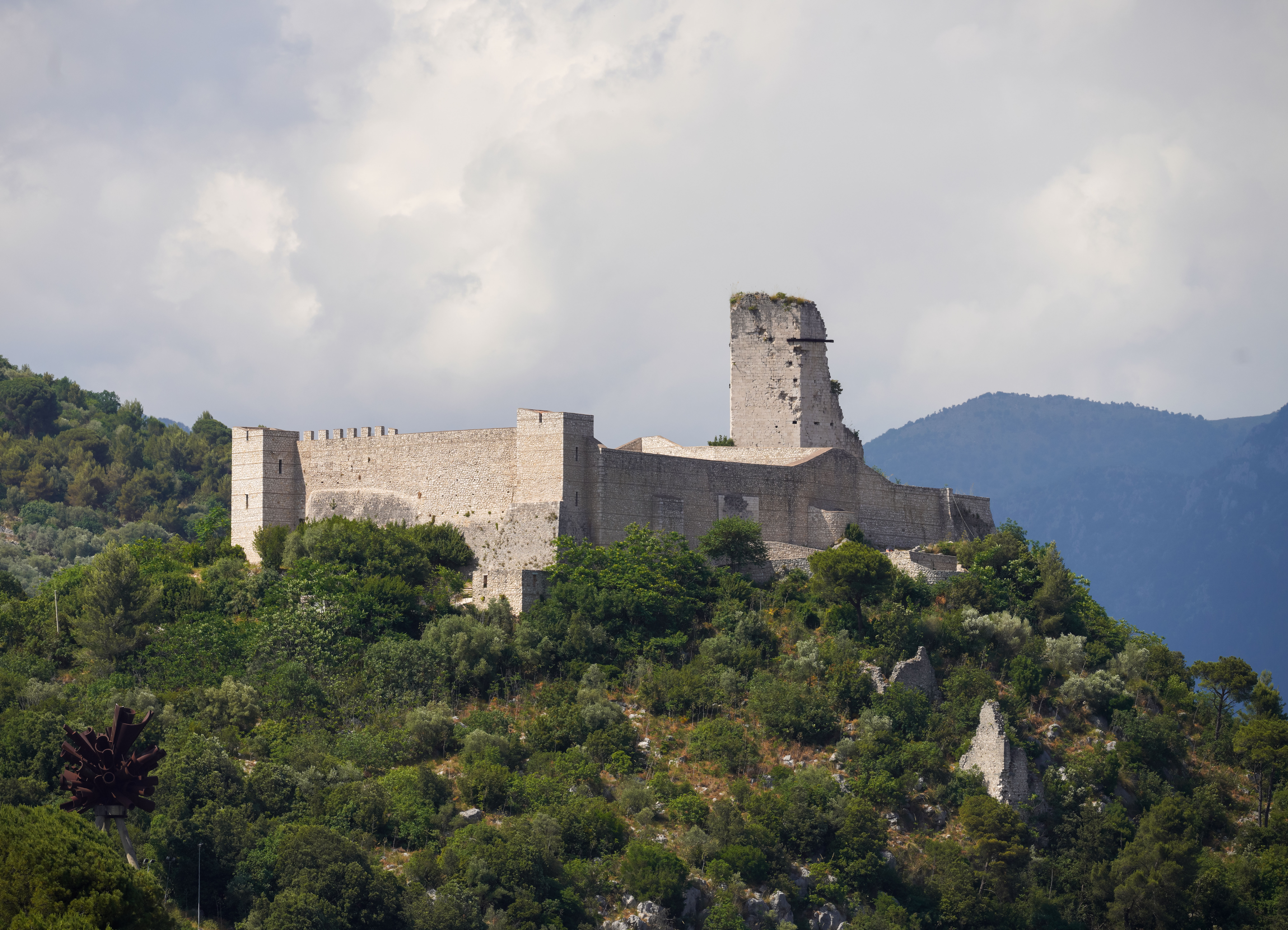
Ruins of Rocca Janula today

Henry of Morra gathered reinforcements for the defence of Monte Cassino. On the same day that Frederick entered Jerusalem, 17 March, there were skirmishes around the monastery. Henry and Landulf of Aquino, both wounded, retreated to the monastery. The legate demanded that the abbot surrender the monastery and hand over the garrison as prisoners. The abbot initially refused, but finally agreed to hand over the monastery if the troops inside were allowed to leave free. This was agreed. According to the Annales placentini guelfi, among those garrisoning the monastery was a group of Arabs. Henry retreated with his men to Capua. San Germano, Rocca Janula, Presenzano, Venafro and Isernia surrendered.

The papal army began a new offensive in late March. The papal strategy was to capture all of the kingdom's ports and so capture Frederick when he attempted to return. Frederick received letters in the Holy Land urging him to return but warning him that there were plans to capture him if he tried. They credit John of Brienne with devising this strategy.

The papal army's advance into Campania, however, was slow. Pandulf advanced down the Garigliano towards Suessa, where he faced the most serious resistance yet. Before the fall of Suessa, Pelagius replaced him as commander of the main army. Suessa surrendered only after running low on water. Gaeta put up stout resistance and only surrendered after being placed under excommunication. Its castle was razed. At this moment, the papal enclave of Benevento launched a cattle raid into Apulia, which was checked by Count Rao of Balbano. Henry of Morra responded with punitive attacks on Beneventan territory in the vicinity of Santa Maria di Porta Somma.

The papal army under the legate advanced on Capua. Unable to take it by force, he began a siege. Forces were dispatched to capture Alife and Telese before linking up with the Beneventans. The Beneventans then captured Apice, which belonged to Count Rao; Paduli; Ceppaloni; and the area around Montefusco.

=== Papal rule in occupied territories ===
On 19 May, Gregory wrote to Pelagius reminding him to minimize bloodshed, since the Kingdom of Sicily belonged to the church. Gregory was especially dismayed to learn of the mistreatment of prisoners of war, including executions, which he strictly prohibited. A harsh campaign conflicted with his goals. He sought the support of the south Italian towns, having offered to recognize the autonomy of Gaeta and Naples on the north Italian model in return for recognition of papal suzerainty and payment of taxes. That same day (19 May), he granted Suessa the same rights and privileges as his own home town of Anagni. In June, he confirmed Gaeta's communal privileges.

At the high point of the campaign, Gregory tried to exercise authority over the island of Sicily, granting privileges and demanding the remittance of taxes. The native Muslims of western Sicily, who lived on what was effectively a large reservation, rebelled against the prospect of papal lordship. As the war dragged on, the pope's financial troubles increased. He received loans from the cardinals. Matthew of Paris accused John of Brienne of plundering churches and monasteries to pay his troops. In order to crack resistance, Gregory had rumours spread that Frederick was either dead or captured in the Holy Land. In the end, the papal army advanced only as far south as the Volturno–Irpino.

=== Frederick's counteroffensive ===
Frederick cut short his stay in the Holy Land and returned to Italy because of the invasion of Campania. He landed without warning at Brindisi on 10 June and immediately launched a counteroffensive against the papal forces. His army contained returning crusaders, including some Germans who had been forced by storms to dock in Brindisi. The south Italian nobility had mostly remained loyal and flocked to his banner. Some crusaders, however, refused to fight for him in Italy. He dispatched reinforcements to Capua. The main papal army immediately began to fray upon receiving news of his return. Pelagius requested help from the northern army then besieging Sulmona. John of Brienne and Giovanni Colonna lifted the siege and for the first time all of the papal armies converged near Capua.

Although Gregory never called Frederick a heretic, some of his supporters (such as Codagnello) did. In August 1229, he renewed the excommunication of Frederick, Rainald and Berthold alongside a long list of heretical sects. He was still trying to lure southern towns into his allegiance. On 29 August, after the town of Sora had surrendered but while the garrison in the citadel was still resisting, Gregory confirmed the town's rights. On 7 September, he promised Amiterno and Forcona that they could elect their own consuls and podestà if they would declare for him.

The papal army, however, was being relentlessly pushed back. Frederick was still in Apulia, at Barletta, on 23 August, when he wrote a letter to Fakhr al-Dīn ibn al-Shaykh, the former Ayyubid ambassador, describing the pope's campaign against him (and singling out the treachery of the abbot of Monte Cassino). Frederick marched on the Terra di Lavoro, but the siege of Capua was lifted before he arrived before the city in September. At this juncture, the situation having turned desperate, Gregory finally offered the remission of sins to those who took part in the war against Frederick, effectively upgrading the war into a quasi-crusade. He wrote to Archbishop Robert of Lyon (28 September), Bishop William II of Paris (30 September) and Archbishop Henry of Milan (9 October) promising them remission of sins for themselves and any soldiers they might bring. Gregory stopped short, however, of specifying the full crusade indulgence. In September, changing tack in his propaganda, he began claiming that Frederick was working in alliance with the Ayyubids.

In contrast to Gregory's flailing, Frederick struck a triumphant tone when he wrote to his subjects in the Kingdom of Italy on 5 October informing them of his rapid progress and requesting troops, horses and weapons to finish the job. At the same time, Frederick wrote to the rulers of Europe defending the justness of his cause.

By the end of October, John of Brienne had retreated back into papal territory. The papal army ever running low on funds, Giovanni Colonna returned to papal territory in order to raise money, and was accused of abandoning the army. Pelagius extorted a contribution from the local clergy by threatening to confiscate the entire wealth of Monte Cassino and the churches of San Germano. According to Richard of San Germano, the retreat of the main papal force back to San Germano was orderly, but after that it disintegrated in full retreat into papal territory. Most of the places that had been in papal hands, some for mere weeks, quickly capitulated to Frederick's troops. Monte Cassino, Gaeta and Sora, however, held out. The town of Sora, but not its fortress, was taken and plundered on 24 October. Many of its inhabitants were hanged. By 11 November, Frederick was in San Germano.

=== End of hostilities ===
Frederick did not launch a counter-invasion of the Papal States, preferring to open negotiations. He did not even try to reoccupy Ancona and Spoleto. He did confiscate the properties of the Templars and Hospitallers because of the opposition they had shown him during his crusade. The papal garrison at Monte Cassino was allowed to leave the kingdom in peace. According to a private letter of Thomas of Capua, Pelagius seemed "more dead than alive" after several months besieged.

The active phase of the war ended with the start of peace negotiations in November 1229. In early July 1230, Thomas of Capua received letters instructing him on the debellatio. It was only then, after the final "form of peace" had been agreed, that all sieges were lifted and most papal forces in Sicilian territory, including garrisons, began to withdraw. A few castles remained garrisoned by the papacy to guarantee enforcement of the treaty.

== Peace treaty ==
The initiative for peace came from Frederick and probably also some cardinals. In October 1229, the Roman Senate opened negotiations with Frederick. On 4 November, Thomas of Capua arrived to open negotiations on behalf of the pope. On 10 November, Gregory authorized Cardinal Giovanni Colonna to absolve Frederick of his excommunication and informed the Lombard League that he had opened peace negotiations. On 11 November, he wrote to Frederick expressing his desire to accept him back into the church.

The negotiations were long. They were concluded only through the intervention of the German princes and the Teutonic grand master Hermann von Salza. In April 1230, Gregory renewed the excommunication of Rainald to prevent him from taking part in the negotiations. The German princes negotiated the accord that was signed at San Germano on 23 July 1230. Duke Leopold VI of Austria, who played a leading role in negotiations, died only five days later. Frederick's excommunication was lifted on 28 August at Ceprano and all other papal acts against him canceled. A general amnesty was issued to those of Frederick's subjects who had supported the pope. The Templar and Hospitaller properties were returned and Frederick surrendered his legatine authority over the Sicilian church. Frederick recognized the Papal States and papal rights over Gaeta and Sant'Agata.

== Contemporary responses ==
Two competing troubadour poems. Guilhem Figueira (left) attacks the Papacy, while Gormonda de Monpeslier (right) defends it. Note in both poems the repeated initial R for Roma, a metonym for the papacy.

Contemporary discussion of the War of the Keys centred on the doctrine of the two swords, that is, the "material sword" (gladius materialis) and the "spiritual sword" (gladius spiritualis), based on Luke 22:38. Gregory's right to wield the latter was unquestioned, but his right to wield the former by raising and directing armies was not clear. Gregory was clear about what he was doing, however. In a letter read before the English assembly, Gregory said: "we have begun to exercise the temporal power, gathering many armies with ample stipends for this purpose." In February–March 1229, while Frederick was in the Holy Land, he received a letter from his bailiff in Jerusalem, Count Thomas of Acerra, assuring him that the barons and clergy of the kingdom of Jerusalem were shocked that Gregory had "decreed contrary to Christian law to vanquish you with the material sword, since, he says, he is unable to cast you down by the spiritual sword." Against the pope's interpretation of Luke, Thomas quoted Matthew 26:52, "put your sword in its scabbard, for all those who strike with the sword, shall perish by it."

The Annales placentini guelfi, in defending the pope's decision, agrees with Thomas of Acerra that he took up the material sword because the spiritual proved ineffective against Frederick. The annalist accuses Frederick of wanting to destroy the church. He records that Gregory took the momentous step of declaring war only after taking counsel with both lay and ecclesiastical leaders.

The most direct criticism of the pope's war against the emperor is found in the writings of two troubadours. They were writing in southern France during the final stage or the aftermath of the Albigensian Crusade. It has even been argued that they were paid propagandists of the emperor, but there is no direct evidence of this. In his anticlerical Clergue si fan pastor, Peire Cardenal denounces John of Brienne for invading Frederick's territory while the latter was in Jerusalem. He assures the Muslims that they have nothing to fear, since the church is more interested in seizing land in Europe. In the song D'un sirventes far, Guilhem Figueira attacks the Papacy for a string of wars against Christians: the sack of Constantinople, the Albigensian Crusade and the War of the Keys. It was still being sung decades later. Guilhem denies the validity of the remission of sins offered by the pope for the war. His was not a general criticism of crusading, however, as he saw crusades and papal wars against Christians as a dangerous distraction from the serious needs of the Holy Land.

Another Occitan poet, the trobairitz Gormonda de Monpeslier, wrote in praise of papal policy. She wrote a direct response to Guilhem defending the pope's actions and criticizing the emperor.

Criticism was also expressed in many chronicles from Germany, such as Burchard of Ursperg's Chronicon, the Annales sancti Rudberti Salisburgenses and the Annales Scheftlarienses maiores. According to the Chronicon wormatiense, the pope was to blame for Frederick failing to conquer all of the Holy Land. An anonymous monk of Saint Emmeram's wrote in a marginal note that there was "great anger" in Germany when the pope absolved crusaders from their vows on account of Frederick's excommunication. Several German lyric poets or Minnesänger expressed similar sentiments: Freidank, who accompanied Frederick on crusade; Walther von der Vogelweide, who was prevented from going on account of Frederick's excommunication; and Bruder Wernher.

Some contemporaries saw the conflict as a "grudge match" between two old rivals, John of Brienne and Frederick II, who had previously sparred over the regency of Jerusalem. This view is found, to some degree or other, in Richard of San Germano, Roger of Wendover, Aubry of Troisfontaines, the Colbert–Fontainebleau Eracles and the Chronicle of Ernoul.

== Analysis ==
Modern analysis of the War of the Keys typically focuses on how the papal expedition fits into the history of the development of the political crusades. It has been called a "semi-crusade", a "'half' or 'quasi' crusade" and even an unqualified crusade. In contrast to the later crusade against Frederick II in 1239, Graham Loud calls it "the crusade that never was." The Annales placentini gibellini does not depict the war of 1229 as a crusade, clearly distinguishing it from the crusade of 1239. The English chroniclers, too, see it as a political and not a holy war. Matthew of Paris described it as "[Gregory's] war ... against the Roman emperor".

Gregory never used the language of crusading in reference to his campaign against Frederick. He referred to the "service of the church" (ecclesie obsequiis, ecclesie servitis), the "business of the church" (negotio ecclesie) and the "business against Frederick, so-called emperor" (negotium contra Fridericum dictum imperatorem). In his letter to Peter of Portugal, Gregory did heighten the spiritual element when he referred to the "service of the bride of Christ" (obsequium sponse Christi). Gregory finally offered spiritual awards only after his cause was already lost. There was never any crusade preaching. Nor was the sign of the cross used by the papal army. Unlike crusaders, the soldiers who fought under the keys took no vows. The standard methods of crusade financing, however, were employed.

Richard of San Germano stresses that it was the army under Frederick that was the true "army of the crusaders" (crucesignatorum exercitus), containing as it did many soldiers returning from the Sixth Crusade. Many apparently still wore their crosses while fighting in Italy.

Joseph Strayer, surveying the pope's fundraising successes, remarks that in 1228–1229, "for the first time, the papacy could afford a first-class war." He suggests that Gregory IX's background in canon law left him too scrupulous to declare a crusade against the emperor early in his pontificate.

== Timeline ==
- 1227
  - August – Frederick turns back from his crusade claiming illness
  - 10 October – Gregory excommunicates Frederick the first time
- 1228
  - March – Gregory threatens to confiscate Sicily
  - June – Frederick leaves on the Sixth Crusade
  - August – Rainald invades Spoleto
  - October – Rainald invades Ancona; John of Brienne's counteroffensive begins
  - November – Gregory excommunicates Rainald
  - December – major papal fundraising begins; papal army already divided in three
- 1229
  - 18 January – papal army invades the Kingdom of Sicily
  - February – Gregory requests more support from the Lombard League
  - springtime – Suessa and Gaeta capitulate; fighting around Benevento; Capua besieged
    - March – fighting in the Liri Valley; papal troops capture Monte Cassino; Frederick takes control of Jerusalem
    - April – John of Brienne besieging Sulmona
    - May – Gregory accuses Lombards of not fulfilling their obligations; privileges granted to Suessa
  - June – Frederick arrives back in Apulia; privileges confirmed to Gaeta
  - July – Gregory demands an extension to the Lombards' term of service
  - August – Sora capitulates to papal troops; Frederick at Barletta; Lombard League embroiled in a civil war
  - September – Frederick arrives before Capua after siege lifted; Gregory offers remission of sins to participants
  - October – John of Brienne retreats from Sicilian kingdom; Giovanni Colonna raising money in the Papal States; Frederick sacks Sora
  - November – Gregory opens negotiations with Frederick; active hostilities cease
- 1230
  - 23 July – peace treaty agreed at San Germano; debellatio begins
  - 28 August – Frederick released from excommunication

== Bibliography ==
- Abulafia, David (1988). Frederick II: A Medieval Emperor. Allen Lane.
- Abulafia, David (2000) [1994]. "The Kingdom of Sicily and the Origins of the Political Crusades". Mediterranean Encounters, Economic, Religious and Political, 1100–1550. Variorum Collected Studies Series. Longman. pp. 65–77.
- Barrell, Andrew D. M. (2005). "Scotland and the Papacy in the Reign of Alexander II". In Richard Oram (ed.). The Reign of Alexander II, 1214–49. Brill. pp. 157–177.
- Bloch, Herbert (1986). Monte Cassino in the Middle Ages. Vol. 1. Harvard University Press.
- Brentano, Robert (1994). A New World in a Small Place: Church and Religion in the Diocese of Rieti, 1188–1378. University of California Press.
- Donovan, Joseph P. (1950). Pelagius and the Fifth Crusade. University of Pennsylvania Press. ISBN 9780404154165.
- Ferguson, Paul Craig (1997). Medieval Papal Representatives in Scotland: Legates, Nuncios, and Judges-delegate, 1125–1286. Stair Society.
- Gabrieli, Francesco, ed. (2010) [1957]. Arab Historians of the Crusades. Translated by E. J. Costello. Routledge.
- Gregorovius, Ferdinand (1897). History of the City of Rome in the Middle Ages. Vol. 5, Part 1. Translated by Annie Hamilton. George Bell & Sons.
- Jamison, Evelyn Mary (1934). "The Abbess Bethlem of S. Maria di Porta Somma and the Barons of the Terra Beneventana". In F. M. Powicke (ed.). Oxford Essays in Medieval History Presented to Herbert Edward Salter. Clarendon Press. pp. 33–67.
- Jordan, Édouard [in French] (1909). Les Origines de la domination Angevine en Italie. Alphonse Picard.
- Kantorowicz, Ernst (1957) [1931]. Frederick the Second, 1194–1250. Translated by E. O. Lorimer. Frederick Ungar.
- Li, Wendan (2021). Die Vita Papst Gregors IX. (1227–1241): Papst und päpstliches Amt in kurialie Sicht. Böhlau Verlag.
- Lock, Peter (2006). Routledge Companion to the Crusades. Routledge.
- Loud, G. A. (2016) [2011]. "The Papal 'Crusade' against Frederick II in 1228–1230". In Michel Balard (ed.). La Papauté et les croisades / The Papacy and the Crusades. Routledge. pp. 91–103.
- Matthew, Donald (1992). The Norman Kingdom of Sicily. Cambridge University Press.
- Partner, Peter (1972). The Lands of St. Peter: The Papal State in the Middle Ages and the Early Renaissance. University of California Press.
- Perry, Guy (2013). John of Brienne: King of Jerusalem, Emperor of Constantinople, c. 1175–1237. Cambridge University Press.
- Perry, Guy (2018). The Briennes: The Rise and Fall of a Champenois Dynasty in the Age of the Crusades, c. 950–1356. Cambridge University Press.
- Raccagni, Gianluca (2016). "The Crusade Against Frederick II: A Neglected Piece of Evidence" (PDF). The Journal of Ecclesiastical History. 67 (4): 721–740. doi:10.1017/S002204691600066X.
- Raccagni, Gianluca (2023). "Gregory IX and the 'Lombard Question'". In Damian J. Smith (ed.). Pope Gregory IX (1227–1241): Power and Authority. Amsterdam University Press. pp. 71–100.
- Rist, Rebecca (2011). The Papacy and Crusading in Europe, 1198–1245. Bloomsbury.
- Sharon, Moshe; Schraeger, Ami (2012). "Frederick II's Arabic Inscription from Jaffa (1229)". Crusades. 11: 139–158. doi:10.1080/28327861.2012.12220338.
- Siberry, Elizabeth (1985). Criticism of Crusading, 1095–1274. Clarendon Press. ISBN 9780198219538.
- Silorata, Mario Bernabò (2007). Gregorio IX e Federico II di Svevia: incontri e scontri tra sacerdozio e impero. Nerbini.
- Strayer, Joseph R. (1969). "The Political Crusades of the Thirteenth Century". In R. L. Wolff; H. W. Hazard (eds.). A History of the Crusades, Volume II: The Later Crusades, 1189–1311. University of Wisconsin Press. pp. 343–375.
- Throop, Palmer A. (1975) [1940]. Criticism of the Crusade: A Study of Public Opinion and Crusade Propaganda. Porcupine Press. ISBN 9780879916183.
- Van Cleve, Thomas C. (1969). "The Crusade of Frederick II". In R. L. Wolff; H. W. Hazard (eds.). A History of the Crusades, Volume II: The Later Crusades, 1189–1311. University of Wisconsin Press. pp. 429–462.
- Van Cleve, Thomas C. (1972). The Emperor Frederick II of Hohenstaufen: Immutator Mundi. Clarendon Press.
- Waley, Daniel Philip (1961). The Papal State in the Thirteenth Century. Macmillan.
- Whalen, Brett Edward (2019). The Two Powers: The Papacy, the Empire, and the Struggle for Sovereignty in the Thirteenth Century. University of Pennsylvania Press.
