= Annals of Piacenza =

Annals of Piacenza (Latin: Annales Placentini) or Chronicle of Piacenza (Latin: Chronicon Placentinum) may refer to:

- Guelph Annals of Piacenza (1031–1235), Latin, written by Giovanni Codagnello
- Ghibelline Annals of Piacenza (1154–1284), Latin, anonymous
- Chronica Placentina (to 1370/4), Latin, written by Pietro da Ripalta

== See also ==
- Piacenza (disambiguation)
