= Two Swords =

Two Swords may refer to:

- "Two Swords", a song from The Beat 1980 album I Just Can't Stop It
- "Two Swords" (Game of Thrones), a 2014 episode of the HBO series Game of Thrones
- "Two Swords", a 2017 episode of the animated series Adventure Time
- Doctrine of the two swords
  - "two swords" of Luke 22:38 (Sell your cloak and buy a sword)
- Grunwald Swords
- Hands of Victory, a monument in Baghdad
- Hyōhō Niten Ichi-ryū, Japanese style of swordsmanship

== See also ==
- Madame Tussauds
