= Battle of San Cesario =

Civil war between the members of the Lombard League

The battle of San Cesario in August 1229 was the culmination of a civil war between the members of the Lombard League. In the pitched battle, Modena and its allies defeated Bologna and its allies.

The war, which began in 1226, pitted Bologna, supported by Milan and Piacenza, against Modena, supported by Cremona and Parma. Bologna's former ally, Reggio, remained neutral. In 1228, Bologna invaded the territory of Modena, but an epidemic forced its withdrawal.

In August 1229, Bologna laid siege to the Modenese castle of San Cesario. According to the Guelph Annals of Piacenza, the commune of Piacenza sent 174 knights to assist Bologna. According to Salimbene de Adam, the castle was captured within sight of the armies of Modena, Parma and Cremona. The result was that "one night there was a great fight between them ... and there was a great slaughter of men, footsoldiers and knights, on both sides." The Bolognese were forced to retreat, "leaving their carroccio and all their equipment in the field".

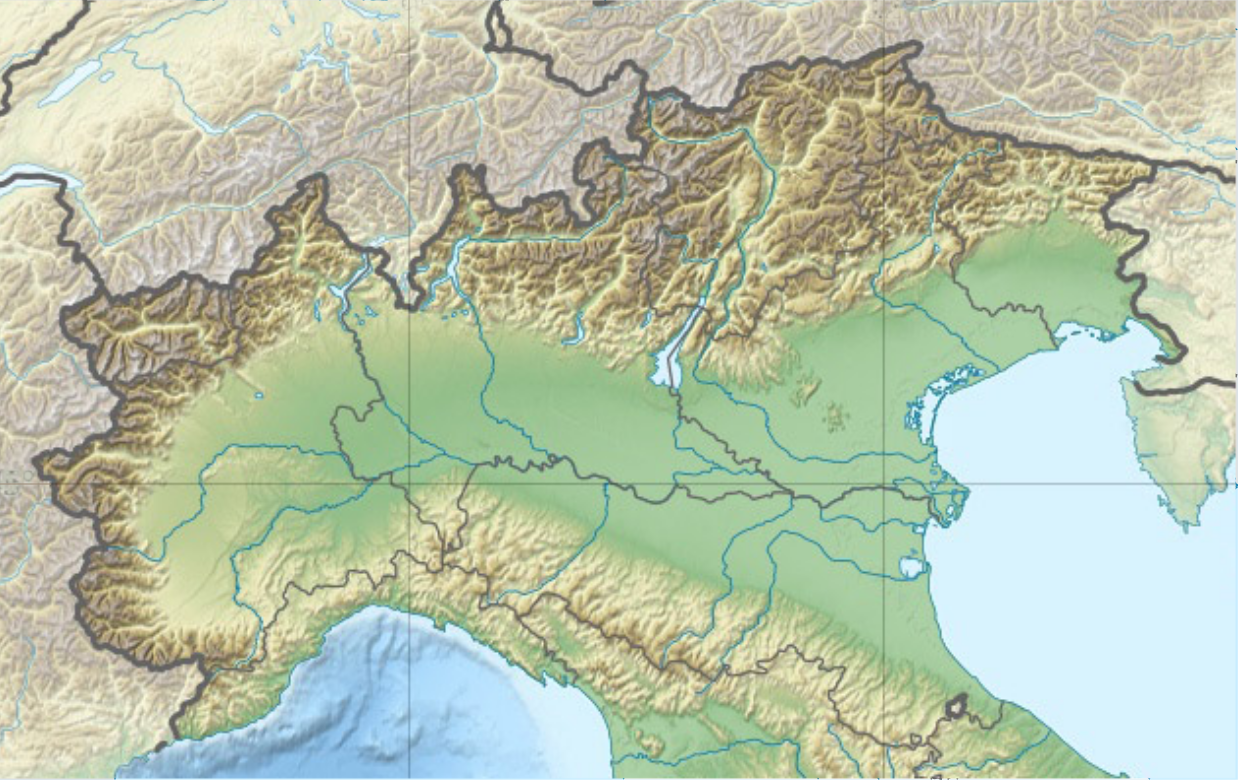
Cities and locations of the Lombard civil war of 1229: Modena and its allies, Bologna and its allies, neutral Reggio and the site of the battle

In the aftermath of their victory, the Modenese intended to take the abandoned carroccio back to Modena, but the Parmesans intervened on Bologna's behalf. Salimbene has them saying that "it was not good to do all the harm they could to their enemies, and that" taking the carroccio "would be an indelible affront and would provoke many evils." As a result, the carroccio was taken to the Bolognese castle of Piumazzo and returned.

One of the victims of the battle was Salimbene's father's first cousin, Berardo Oliverio di Adamo, who fought on the side of Parma. As an honour, his body lay in state before the font of the Parma Baptistery. His obituary in the Chronicon Parmense calls him "an eloquent judge and a proven soldier" who died "in the battle of San Cesario" and was buried in "the church of Sant'Agata, which is the chapel of the greater church of the city of Parma."

According to Pietro Cantinelli, elements of the Bolognese militia mutinied after the retreat. There was a riot and the Palazzo Communale was occupied. The rioters demanded peace and the communal authorities opened negotiations with Modena. Bishop Enrico della Fratta served as one of the Bolognese negotiators. Guala de Roniis mediated. A truce was signed on 11 December 1229 for nine years, although Bologna broke it in 1234.

The Bolognese–Modenese war and battle of San Cesario took place while Pope Gregory IX was trying to rally the Lombard League to fight for him against the league's erstwhile enemy, Emperor Frederick II, in the so-called War of the Keys. A comparison of the number of troops committed by the communes to the war against Frederick and the war between themselves indicates how much greater importance they attached to the latter.

== Bibliography ==
- Dean, Trevor, ed. (2000). The Towns of Italy in the Later Middle Ages. Manchester University Press.
- Husain, Adnan A. (2005). "Writing Identity as Remembered History: Person, Place, and Time in Friar Salimbene's Autobiographical Prose Map". Viator. 36: 265–292. doi:10.1484/J.VIATOR.2.300013.
- Jansen, Katherine L.; Drell, Joanna; Andrews, Frances, eds. (2009). Medieval Italy: Texts in Translation. University of Pennsylvania Press.
- Loud, G. A. (2016) [2011]. "The Papal 'Crusade' against Frederick II in 1228–1230". In M. Balard (ed.). The Papacy and the Crusades. Routledge. pp. 91–103.
- Thompson, Augustine (2005). Cities of God: The Religion of the Italian Communes, 1125–1325. Pennsylvania State University Press.
- Thompson, Augustine (2010) [1992]. Revival Preachers and Politics in Thirteenth Century Italy: The Great Devotion of 1233. Wipf & Stock.
