= Placentia =

Placentia may refer to:

- Palace of Placentia, an English royal palace
- Placentia, Italy, a Roman city known today as Piacenza
- Placentia, Newfoundland and Labrador, Canada
  - Placentia Bay, body of water
- Placentia, California, United States
  - Placentia station, proposed train station in Placentia
- Battle of Placentia (disambiguation)
- Placentia Bay
- HMS Placentia, the name of two ships of the Royal Navy
- Placencia (queen), 11th-century queen of Navarre, called Placentia in Latin

== See also ==
- Placencia, Belize
- Plasencia, Extremadura, Spain
- Plentzia, Basque Country, Spain
- Piacenza (disambiguation)
- Plaisance (disambiguation), a French word
- Not to be confused with Placenta
