= Stephen of Anagni =

Italian priest

Stephen of Anagni (Italian: Stefano di Anagni, Latin: Stephanus de Anagnia; died December 1256) was an Italian priest in papal service.

Stephen belonged to a wealthy family and was a major property owner in and around his hometown. He was close to Pope Gregory IX from when the latter was just a cardinal. A papal chaplain from 1221, he was active in England perhaps as early as 1225, certainly by 1227, collecting papal revenues. In 1228–1229, he was also accredited to Scotland, Ireland and Wales for a special collection. He returned to Italy in 1232. From 1236 until 1239, he was rector of Campagna e Marittima in the Papal States. He was not as active in his later years, but his will, made shortly before he died, attests to his great wealth.

== Early life ==
Stephen was born at Anagni in the final quarter of the twelfth century. His father was John, son of Anastasius. He had at least one brother, Thomas, and one sister, Altruda. He is usually thought to have been related to Pope Gregory IX, who was also from Anagni. His family was of the upper (knightly) class in Anagni, he inherited great wealth and a document of 1214 shows him buying more property in Anagni. In 1221, he was a magister, a canon of the cathedral of Anagni and the chamberlain of Gregory when the latter was still just a cardinal. He may be the Stephen, called Gregory's nephew, who was rector of the church of Carlton, Cambridgeshire, a dependency of Lewes Priory, in 1225–1227.

== Collector in England ==
In 1227, Stephen was in England as the general collector of papal revenues. He received a safeconduct from King Henry III on 22 October 1227 and the king gave him 1,000 marks for expenses on 7 November. He was probably by that time already a papal chaplain. He probably owed this promotion to Gregory IX, who was elected in 1227.

Stephen was commissioned on 23 December 1228 to collect a special tithe in England, Wales, Scotland and Ireland to support the pope's armies in the War of the Keys in southern Italy. Sources do not agree on whether he was a legate or a nuncio. In April 1229, Henry III called an assembly of the realm at which Stephen read out the papal letters demanding a tithe. Stephen was also empowered to demand that clergy swear oaths on the Gospels that they had paid their share and to excommunicate those who refused. According to Roger of Wendover, there was great resistance to these measures in England. According to the Scotichronicon, when Stephen attempted to execute his commission in Scotland in early 1229, he was refused entry.

The first reference to Stephen in surviving papal letters is found in a letter sent to him on 15 January 1230, in which Gregory IX ordered him to cease demanding payment of a census from Faversham Abbey. In June 1232, he was one of the nuncios at the court of Henry III. On 21 December 1232, he was back in Anagni.

== Rector in Campagna ==
For the next four years Stephen served Pope Gregory in and around Anagni and Rome. Although he was still a canon of Anagni, he did not live in the chapterhouse but in his own large house near the cathedral, claiming to be "infirm of body". On 26 February 1233 in Anagni, he resolved a dispute between the pope and the citizens of Paliano, which the pope had recently purchased and was in the process of fortifying. On 8 January 1236, acting on Gregory's behalf, he made over a property at Frosinone to Amato of Ferentino. Shortly afterwards, he was made rector of the province of Campagna e Marittima. His immediate predecessor, Donus, was last recorded as rector on 21 January. In 1237, Stephen had to judge a lawsuit between one of the most powerful lords in his rectorate, Conrad of Sgurgola, and the monastery of San Pietro in Villa Magna. Surviving letters show that the abbot and citizens of Villa Magna appealed over him to the pope.

In December 1237, in his own house in Anagni, Stephen as rector witnessed an exchange of property between two Cistercian monasteries, Santa Maria di Marmosolio and Santa Maria della Gloria in Anagni. In early 1239 or possibly earlier, he lost or resigned his post as rector for reasons unknown.

== Later life ==
Stephen's life after his term as rector is poorly documented. On 3 September 1245, his brother Thomas, described as a knight of Anagni, received the castle of Fumone as a hereditary papal fief. This was almost certainly in recognition of the loyalty shown by the family and especially the services rendered by Stephen. Pope Alexander IV confirmed the enfeoffment of Thomas in 1255 and the castle afterwards passed to Nicholas of Anagni.

In 1252, Stephen was a chaplain in the household of the future Alexander IV, then still a cardinal. On 29 May 1252, he resigned a canonry and prebend of Hereford Cathedral, which he had acquired from the bishop, Peter of Aigueblanche, on the recommendation of the pope sometime after 1240. He had the notary Andrew of Veroli draw up his will on 4 December 1256. It is preserved in the cathedral archives of Anagni. He left almost everything to his nephew Stephen, Thomas's son, including palaces, houses, casalia and vineyards. He was dead by 20 December 1256, when Alexander IV ordered the bishop of Anagni not to annex to the bishopric what Stephen had left to Santa Maria della Gloria in his will. Stephen also left ten pounds to Marmosolio, one hundred to the cathedral of Anagni and ten marks to a church in Hereford. He left behind a large library. Nicholas of Anagni was one of Stephen's executors.

== Bibliography ==
- Abulafia, David (2000). "The Kingdom of Sicily and the Origins of the Political Crusades". Mediterranean Encounters, Economic, Religious and Political, 1100–1550. Longman. pp. 65–77.
- Barrow, Julia, ed. (2002). "Prebendaries: Huntington". Fasti Ecclesiae Anglicanae, 1066–1300. Vol. 8, Hereford. Institute of Historical Research. pp. 44–46.
- Barrow, Julia (2011). "Peter of Aigueblanche's Support Network". Thirteenth Century England. 13: 27–40.
- Caraffa, Filippo (1981). "Il testamento di Stefano d'Anagni cappellano di Alessandro IV (4 dicembre 1256)". Archivio della Società romana di storia patria. 104: 97–117.
- Ciammaruconi, Clemente (1998). Da Marmosolio a Valvisciolo: storia di un insediamento cistercense nella Marittima medievale (XII–XVI secolo). Sermoneta.
- Barrell, Andrew D. M. (2005). "Scotland and the Papacy in the Reign of Alexander II". In Richard Oram (ed.). The Reign of Alexander II, 1214–49. Brill. pp. 157–177.
- Ferguson, Paul Craig (1997). Medieval Papal Representatives in Scotland: Legates, Nuncios, and Judges-delegate, 1125–1286. Stair Society.
- Gregorovius, Ferdinand (1897). History of the City of Rome in the Middle Ages. Vol. 5, Part 1. Translated by Annie Hamilton. George Bell & Sons.
- Loud, Graham A. (2016). "The Papal 'Crusade' against Frederick II in 1228–1230". In Michel Balard (ed.). La Papauté et les croisades / The Papacy and the Crusades. Routledge. pp. 91–103.
- Lunt, William Edward (1939). Financial Relations of the Papacy with England to 1327. Mediaeval Academy of America.
- Mercantini, Alessandra (1994). "Stephanus de Anagnia, domini pape capellanus". Latium. 11: 113–190.
- Montaubin, Pascal (1997). "Entre gloire curiale et vie commune: le chapitre cathédral d'Anagni au XIII^{e} siècle". Mélanges de l'École française de Rome. 109 (2): 303–442. doi:10.3406/mefr.1997.3580.
- Montaubin, Pascal (2004). "Bastard Nepotism: Niccolò di Anagni, a Nephew of Pope Gregory IX, and camerarius of Pope Alexander IV". In F. Andrews; C. Egger; C. M. Rousseau (eds.). Pope, Church and City: Essays in Honour of Brenda M. Bolton. Brill. pp. 129–176.
- Underhill, Frances Ann (1965). Papal Legates to England in the Reign of Henry III (1216–1272) (PhD diss.). Indiana University.
- Vendittelli, Marco (2019). "Stefano di Anagni". Dizionario Biografico degli Italiani (in Italian). Vol. 94: Stampa–Tarantelli. Rome: Istituto dell'Enciclopedia Italiana. pp. 132–134. ISBN 978-88-12-00032-6.
- Whalen, Brett Edward (2019). The Two Powers: The Papacy, the Empire, and the Struggle for Sovereignty in the Thirteenth Century. University of Pennsylvania Press.
