= Gottschalk of Aachen =

11th-century German monk

Laus tibi Christe, a sequence by Gottschalk

Gottschalk of Aachen (fl. 1071–1104) was a German monk, notary, poet and composer. A supporter of King Henry IV during the Investiture Contest, his writings laid the theoretical foundation for the state's anti-papal propaganda.

== Chancery service ==
Gottschalk may have been born as early as the 1010s. He was from Northern Germany. In his own writings in Latin, he spells his name Godescalcus. He worked in the chancery of Henry IV from December 1071 to February 1104. He drew up eighty of Henry's surviving diplomas and wrote at least nine of his letters. He was present at the siege of Rome in 1083, when the Leonine City was captured, for he drew up a charter for the archdiocese of Bremen from within the city. He probably left the chancery as a permanent member after 1084, but he continued as capellarius (chief notary) until at least 1098.

Gottschalk was the primary author of two letters from 1076 disputing Pope Gregory VII's claims against Henry. The first of these, drafted at Utrecht following the Synod of Worms, addressed Gregory VII by his baptismal name, Hildebrand, but was never sent. The second summoned the bishops of the kingdom to a diet to be held at Worms on 15 May. In support of Henry, Gottschalk argues that the king can be judged by God alone and deposed only for heresy, citing Pope Gelasius I's Famuli vestrae pietatis and the Bible, specifically Romans 13:2 ("the powers that be are ordained by God"); 1 Peter 2:17 ("fear God, honour the king"); and Luke 22:38 ("here are two swords").

Gottschalk's political ideas also come through in some of the charters he drew up, as in the diploma of 30 October 1077 depriving Ekbert II of Meissen of the county of Stavoren, where he writes that he "who strove to deprive us of the whole kingdom, shall have no part in the kingdom". His political ideas can also be found in one of his musical works, Celi enarrant.

== Religious service ==
At least 24 sequences have been attributed to Gottschalk as a hymnist. The five most securely attributed are Celi enarrant (on the Division of the Apostles); Laus tibi, Christe (for Mary Magdalene); A solis ortu et occasu (on the Cross); Fecunde verbo (for the Virgin Mary); and Exsulta exaltata (for the Virgin Mary). Seven have original melodies. The rest have borrowed or reused melodies. He is the most prolific composer of the "old school" of sequences after Notker Balbulus and one of the latest.

Six opuscula (treatises) are also attributed to Gottschalk. In two of these, he defends the sequences Fecunda verbo and Exsulta exaltata and his theology against criticism. He names his music teacher as Heinricus, composer of Omnis lapis pretiosus. According to the Anonymous of Melk, Gottschalk wrote a book a sermons. One of his more unorthodox theological positions was a denial of the Assumption of Mary.

By 1087, Gottschalk was the provost of the church of Saint Servatius in Maastricht. By 1098, he was the provost of the collegiate church of Saint Mary in Aachen. A document of 1099 names him as chaplain. He later retired as a monk to Klingenmünster Abbey. At Klingenmünster, he composed a liturgical office, which has since been lost, and two opuscula on Saints Abundius and Irenaeus, the patron saints of nearby Limburg Abbey. This misled the scholar Guido Maria Dreves to believe that he was a monk at Limburg.

According to a 13th-century necrology from Aachen, Gottschalk died on 24 November, but the year is unknown.

== Works cited ==
- Brunhölzl, Franz (1964). "Gottschalk (Godescalcus) von Aachen (fälschlich: von Limburg)". Neue Deutsche Biographie (in German). Vol. 6. Berlin: Duncker & Humblot. pp. 684–685. (full text online).
- Dressler, Hermigild (2003). "Gottschalk of Limburg". The New Catholic Encyclopedia. Vol. 6 (2nd ed.). The Catholic University of America Press. pp. 370–371.
- Gushee, Lawrence; McGrade, Michael (2001). "Gottschalk of Aachen". In Sadie, Stanley; Tyrrell, John (eds.). The New Grove Dictionary of Music and Musicians (2nd ed.). London: Macmillan Publishers. ISBN 978-1-56159-239-5.
- McGrade, Michael (1996). "Gottschalk of Aachen, the Investiture Controversy, and Music for the Feast of the Divisio apostolorum". Journal of the American Musicological Society. 49 (3): 351–408. doi:10.2307/831768. JSTOR 831768.
- McGrade, Michael (2010). "Gottschalk of Aachen". In Bjork, Robert E. (ed.). The Oxford Dictionary of the Middle Ages. Oxford: Oxford University Press. ISBN 978-0-19-866262-4.
- Robinson, I. S. (1999). Henry IV of Germany, 1056–1106. Cambridge University Press.
