= Pietro da Ripalta =

Italian notary and historian

Pietro da Ripalta (1335/40–1375) was an Italian notary and historian.

Pietro was born at Piacenza between 1335 and 1340 to Giovanni del fu Gherardo and Sibillina di Francesco Fontana. The family was originally from Rivalta, but they moved to the city early in the 1300s and sold their castle at Rivalta to Obizzo Landi in 1317. Giovanni married three times and Pietro had several siblings and half-siblings, including Filippo, Giovanni, Elena and Giovanna. He entered the notarial profession, where he is first recorded working in private practice alongside Pietro Valla in 1357. In 1366, he married Elena, daughter of Giovanni Pallastrelli, but she was killed by bubonic plague before the couple had any children. Pietro himself died of plague in 1375, leaving his goods to the Consortium of the Holy Spirit. The later chroniclers Antonio and Alberto da Ripalta were his descendants, but how is not known.

Pietro wrote a Chronica Placentina (Chronicle of Piacenza) covering the city's history from its legendary origins to 1370. It is a history of Piacenza nested in a history of Lombardy, northern Italy and the world. It is well structured and elegantly written in Latin. For his earlier history, his sources are Paulus Orosius, Bede, Paul the Deacon, Martin of Opava, Riccobaldo da Ferrara, Benzo d'Alessandria, Galvano Fiamma and Giovanni Codagnello. For more recent history, he relies on eyewitnesses and oral tradition. The Chronica can be divided into three parts. The first is largely legendary and based on universal chronicles. The second is largely a digest of the History of the Lombards Paul the Deacon and its Continuatio Romana. The middle part, concerning the Lombard period, is clearly bracketed by the phrases marking its beginning and end. The third part is more annalistic and more focused on Piacenza.

The Chronica is preserved in fifteen manuscripts from the 14th to 18th centuries, the earliest being Biblioteca Casanatense MS 4158. A short continuation down to 1374 was added at some point. The chronicle was used by Giacomo Mori, Oberto da Mergomo, Giovanni Mussi and Giovanni Agazzari. The copy made by Giacomo Mori has been published, but there is no critical edition.

== Editions ==
- Pietro da Ripalta, "Chronica Placentina" nella trascrizione di Iacopo Mori (Ms. Pallastrelli 6), ed. M. Fillìa and C. Binello; intro. P. Castignoli (Piacenza, 1995).

== Bibliography ==
- Damian-Grint, Peter (2010). "Ripalta, Pietro da". In Graeme Dunphy (ed.). Encyclopedia of the Medieval Chronicle. Vol. 2. Brill. p. 1282. doi:10.1163/2213-2139_emc_SIM_02194.
- Zabbia, Marino (2016). "Ripalta, Pietro da". Dizionario Biografico degli Italiani (in Italian). Vol. 87: Renzi–Robortello. Rome: Istituto dell'Enciclopedia Italiana. ISBN 978-88-12-00032-6.
