= Deeds of the Emperor Frederick on the Holy Expedition =

The Deeds of the Emperor Frederick on the Holy Expedition (Gesta Federici in expeditione sacra) is a short, anonymous Latin account of Frederick Barbarossa's campaign on the Third Crusade (1189–1190). It was probably written in Italy in the 1190s.

Decorated initial G at the start of the Deeds in MS BnF lat. 4931

The Deeds did not circulate widely. It survives in two manuscripts. In Paris, Bibliothèque nationale de France, MS lat. 4931, it takes up eight columns across three folios (105d–107c). In both manuscripts, it is found alongside a longer text about Frederick, the Narration of the Oppression and Subjection of Lombardy, an account of the war with the Lombard League culminating in the battle of Legnano in 1176. This was written shortly after the treaty of Venice in 1177. Ronald Witt suggests that the two may have been written by the same person. Both these texts together were adapted several times by later Italian writers.

The Deeds contains little that is not found in other more substantial sources, such as the History of the Expedition of the Emperor Frederick and the History of the Pilgrims. It is possible that the author of the Deeds had access to the History of the Pilgrims, since in a few cases he uses very similar wording. It is almost certain that he had access to some of the same letters that the authors of the longer accounts did. His account was used by Sicard of Cremona for his chronicle.

The Deeds may occasionally clarify a reading of the Histories or resolve a discrepancy between them. Although modern estimates put Frederick's crusader army at about 15,000 men, the Deeds gives its size as "90,000 armed warriors". Its account of how the army was guided by a Turk to take a road through the Taurus Mountains and avoid the Via Sebaste differs from the others, all of which present the Turk as a prisoner acting under compulsion. According to the Deeds, however, the Turk was an emir who volunteered his services knowing that the emperor could have him beheaded if it turned out he was lying.

== Editions ==
- Holder-Egger, Oswald, ed. (1892). "Gesta Federici I. Imperatoris in Expeditione Sacra". Gesta Federici I. Imperatoris in Lombardia. Monumenta Germaniae Historica. Vol. Scriptores rerum Germanicarum in usum scholarum, 27. Hanover. pp. 74–98.

== Bibliography ==
- Arnaldi, Girolamo (1982). "Codagnello, Giovanni". Dizionario Biografico degli Italiani (in Italian). Vol. 26: Cironi–Collegno. Rome: Institute of the Italian Encyclopaedia. pp. 562–568. ISBN 978-88-12-00032-6.
- Coleman, Edward (2012). "'A city to be built for the glory of God, St Peter, and the whole of Lombardy': Alexander III, Alessandria and the Lombard League in Contemporary Sources". In Peter D. Clarke; Anne J. Duggan (eds.). Pope Alexander III (1159–81): The Art of Survival. Ashgate. pp. 127–151.
- Holder-Egger, Oswald (1891). "Ueber die historischen Werke des Johannes Codagnellus von Piacenza". Neues Archiv der Gesellschaft für ältere deutsche Geschichtskunde. 16: 251–346, 475–509.
- Loud, Graham, ed. (2010). The Crusade of Frederick Barbarossa: The History of the Expedition of the Emperor Frederick and Related Texts. Ashgate.
- Witt, Ronald G. (2012). The Two Latin Cultures and the Foundation of Renaissance Humanism in Medieval Italy. Cambridge University Press.
