= Enrico da Settala =

Enrico da Settala (died 16 September 1230), sometimes anglicized Henry of Settala, was the archbishop of Milan from 1213 until his death.

Enrico studied canon law. A subdeacon of the papal clergy from 1197, he remained close to the papacy throughout his career. His election as archbishop came via papal appointment. As the city of Milan was under interdict, he remained only an archbishop-elect until 1219. He attended the Fourth Lateran Council in 1215 and held his own provincial synod in 1226. He was absent from Milan for several years because he participated in the Fifth Crusade (1220–1221) and his conflicts with the municipal government led him twice into exile (1221–1222, 1224–1225). He supported several new religious movements, such as the friars.

== Subdeacon ==
Enrico belonged to a family of capitaneal rank that had relocated from the town of Settala, from which they took their name, to the city of Milan in the course of the 12th century. They resided near the church of San Giovanni in Conca and the Porta Romana. Prominent among Henry's relatives was Lanfranco da Settala, consul in 1145 and consul of justice in 1156. The names of Henry's parents, however, are unknown.

Enrico was probably born around 1175. He is first mentioned in a document of 22 October 1197 as testifying in a suit involving the church of Santa Maria di Calvairate. He was at the time a papal subdeacon and a canon of the cathedral of Milan. In April 1198, Pope Innocent III referred to him in a letter as capable and knowledgeable in ecclesiastical affairs. Innocent tried to secure Enrico's appointment to the vacant Milanese chancellorship, but Archbishop Filippo da Lampugnano preferred to give that office to a relative of his.

Enrico was not particularly active in the cathedral chapter of Milan, but did undertake certain missions for the papacy in Lombardy. In 1203, Innocent sent Enrico to induce the chapter of Novara into accepting Ariprando Visconti, another papal subdeacon from Milan, as a member. In 1205, he sent him with the archdeacon Guglielmo da Rizolio to settle a lawsuit involving the priest of San Vittore e Quaranta martiri.

Filippo da Lampugnano's successor, Uberto da Pirovano, appointed Enrico treasurer (cimiliarca) of Milan sometime between the end of 1206 and 12 January 1210. On 23 January 1210, Enrico and the archpriest Guglielmo Balbo were charged by Uberto with resolving a lawsuit between the commune of Milan and the abbey of Chiaravalle. Ultimately, the case went to arbitration, with Enrico, the vicar Guidotto and Raniero Butraffio serving as arbitrators. The case was resolved on 23 December.

== Archbishop ==
=== Election to consecration ===
The death of Uberto in 1211 sparked a prolonged crisis in the Milanese church. The chapter first elected Gerardo da Sesso, but he died before the end of the year without ever having acknowledged his election. The next leading candidate, Ariprando Visconti, died in September 1213, prompting the chapter to request that Innocent III appoint an archbishop. On 4 November, Innocent appointed Enrico, who was succeeded as treasurer by a relative, Ugo da Settala. At the time of his appointment, Enrico was said to be "in the school of Bologna" (Bononie in scolis), although it is unclear if he was a student or a teacher. He certainly studied canon law at some point.

Although Enrico had first to be consecrated a deacon and priest before he could be consecrated as a bishop, this was impossible because Milan had been placed under interdict for supporting the excommunicated Emperor Otto IV. He thus remained an archbishop-elect for over five years. In November 1215, he attended the Fourth Lateran Council. In February 1218, he was invited to Rome to receive consecration and the pallium. The immediate cause of the change was the decision of the Milanese podestà Amizone Sacco to renounce the city's support for Otto IV and adhere to Frederick II. His consecration was postponed a second time after a war broke out between the Lombard cities and Milan was again placed under interdict. He was finally consecrated at Rieti in August 1219 by Pope Honorius III.

=== Crusade ===
His own status and that of Milan finally resolved, Enrico chose to join the Fifth Crusade in Egypt. He led a contingent that included the archbishop of Crete and the bishops of Faenza, Reggio and Brescia with many Italian knights and representatives of Frederick II, Holy Roman Emperor. They sailed on a Venetian fleet, arriving in occupied Damietta sometime after 24 June 1220. The chief source for this episode is Oliver of Paderborn's Historia Damiatina.

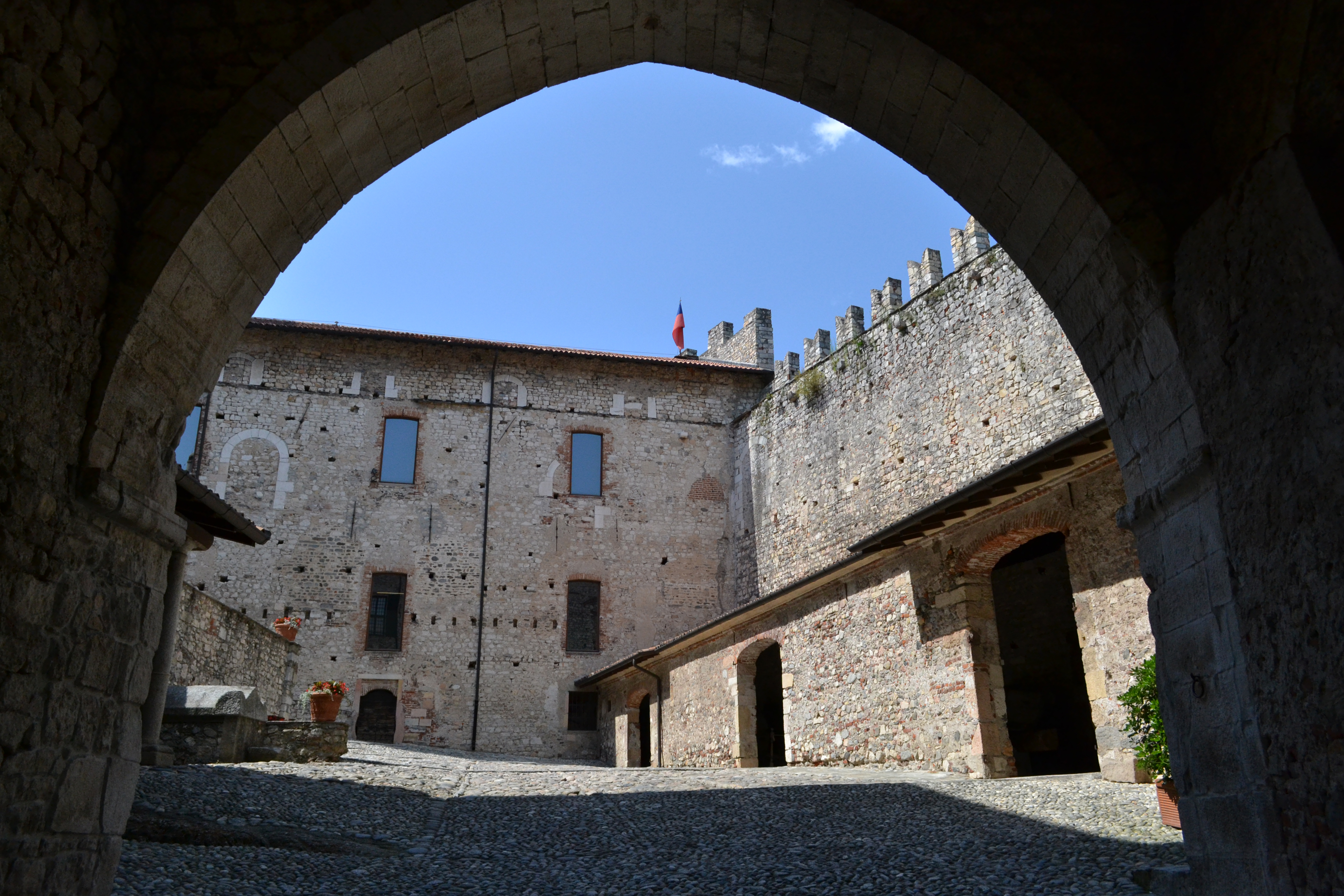
Courtyard of the castle of Angera today

During Enrico's absence on crusade, Ugo da Settala acted as vicar of the archdiocese. With Enrico's permission, he ceded the basilica of Sant'Eustorgio to the Order of Preachers on 24 October 1220. Enrico was still in Egypt when Honorius in June 1221 authorized him to mortgage some property.

=== Conflict with the commune ===
Upon his return from Egypt, Enrico got into a dispute with the city of Monza and excommunicated its podestà and its citizens. This put him at odds with Amizone Sacco and forced him to leave Milan. Cardinal Ugolino dei Conti tried at first to mediate before excommunicating Sacco and the two populist factions of Milanese politics, the Motta and the Credenza di Sant'Ambrogio. Enrico became the effective leader of the aristocratic faction, the Credenza dei Nobili, while the poplists were led by Ardigotto Marcellino.

Enrico passed his exile in various castles around Lago Maggiore, such as those of Angera and Brebbia. The conflict between his supporters, mostly of the nobility, and the Motta and Credenza almost came to open warfare. A battle was only barely averted on 13 August 1222 by an agreement that lifted the excommunication and allowed Enrico back into the city. The accord broke down in February 1224 and Enrico again left the city. Threatening excommunication, Honorius called all parties to Rome for mediation. A new accord was reached and Enrico reentered Milan in 1225.

=== Support for new movements ===
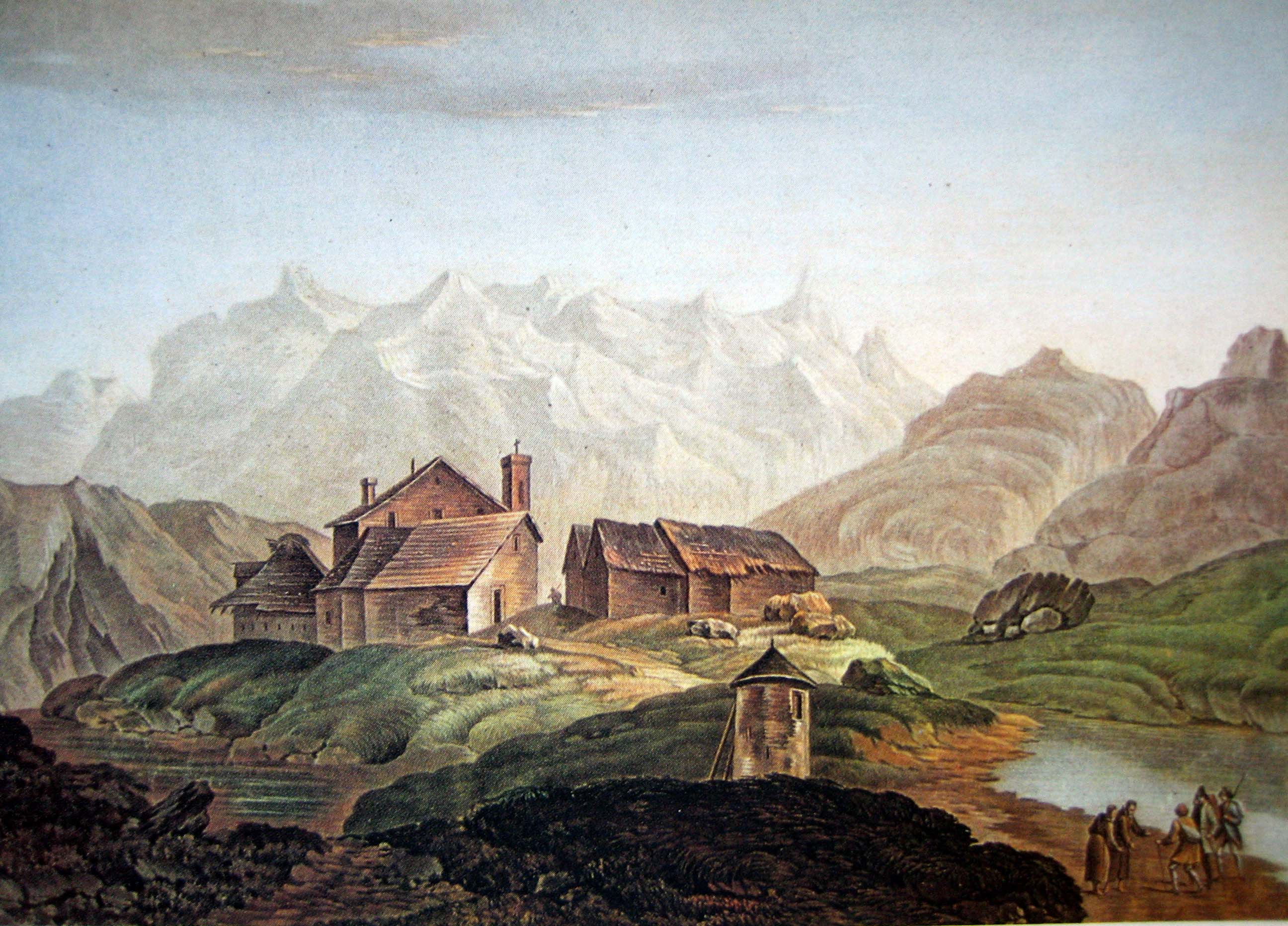
Hospice at the Gotthard Pass (1785 painting by Charles-Melchior Descourtis). The hospice is first mentioned in 1237, although Enrico had dedicated the chapel there in 1230.

As a papal appointee, Enrico took a pro-papal stance and closely aligned himself with the papal legates in Lombardy, Ugolino dei Conti and Goffredo Castiglioni. He supported the Franciscans, the Preachers and the anti-heretical movement.

In November 1224, Enrico gave the church of Sant'Apollinare to the Poor Sisters of Milan, the future Poor Clares. In February 1225, he exempted the order from episcopal jurisdiction as a sign of his devotion. In November 1226, he held a provincial synod, the acts of which are lost. In July 1227, Pope Gregory IX, the former Cardinal Ugolino, ordered Enrico to exempt the Humiliati from swearing oaths except as witnesses in court and a in a few other circumstances. In December, he ordered Enrico to induce all those "who call themselves Humiliati" in Lombardy to either abide by Innocent III's rule for their order or else transfer to a different order. On 9 October 1229, Gregory requested that Enrico lead an armed force to the assistance of the papal army fighting the emperor in southern Italy. In return, Gregory promised a crusade-like "remission of sins".

On 2 December 1229 in the archiepiscopal palace and in the presence of the papal legate Guala de Roniis, Enrico and the commune renewed the accord of five years earlier. In 1230, Enrico consecrated an alpine chapel to Saint Gotthard of Hildesheim, which is associated with the opening of the Gotthard Pass. He died in the archiepiscopal castle of Brebbia on 16 September 1230. His body was first brought to the Franciscan church of San Vittore all'Olmo and then entombed in the Franciscan basilica of San Nabore in Milan.

== Bibliography ==
- Alberzoni, Maria Pia (1990). "Henri de Settala". Dictionnaire d'histoire et de géographie ecclésiastiques. Vol. 23. Paris: Letouzey et Ané. cols. 1227–1230.
- Alberzoni, Maria Pia (2004). Clare of Assisi and the Poor Sisters in the Thirteenth Century. Franciscan Institute Publications.
- Alberzoni, Maria Pia (2018). "Settala, Enrico". Dizionario Biografico degli Italiani, Volume 92: Semino–Sisto IV (in Italian). Rome: Istituto dell'Enciclopedia Italiana. ISBN 978-8-81200032-6.
- Andrews, Frances (1999). The Early Humiliati. Cambridge University Press.
- Claverie, Pierre-Vincent (2013). Honorius III et l'Orient (1216–1227): Étude et publication de sources inédites des Archives vaticanes (ASV). Brill.
- Egli, Emil (1991). "Der St. Gotthard: Bedeutung und Auswirkungen" (PDF). Geographica Helvetica (2).
- Loud, Graham A. (2016) [2011]. "The Papal 'Crusade' against Frederick II in 1228–1230". In Michel Balard (ed.). La Papauté et les croisades / The Papacy and the Crusades. Routledge. pp. 91–103.
- Pigeon, Patrick (2004). "Gestion des risques et peuplements helvétiques: L'exemple du Gothard". Collection Edytem: Cahiers de géographie (2): 151–160.
- Powell, James M. (2010). Anatomy of a Crusade, 1213–1221. University of Pennsylvania Press.
- Taylor, Faye (2013). "Catharism and Heresy in Milan". In Andrew P. Roach; James R. Simpson (eds.). Heresy and the Making of European Culture: Medieval and Modern Perspectives. Ashgate. pp. 383–402.
- Van Cleve, Thomas C. (1969). "The Fifth Crusade" (PDF). In R. L. Wolff; H. W. Hazard (eds.). A History of the Crusades, Vol. 2: The Later Crusades, 1189–1311. University of Wisconsin Press. pp. 376–428.
