= Matthew 10:34 =

- ← 10:33 10:35 →
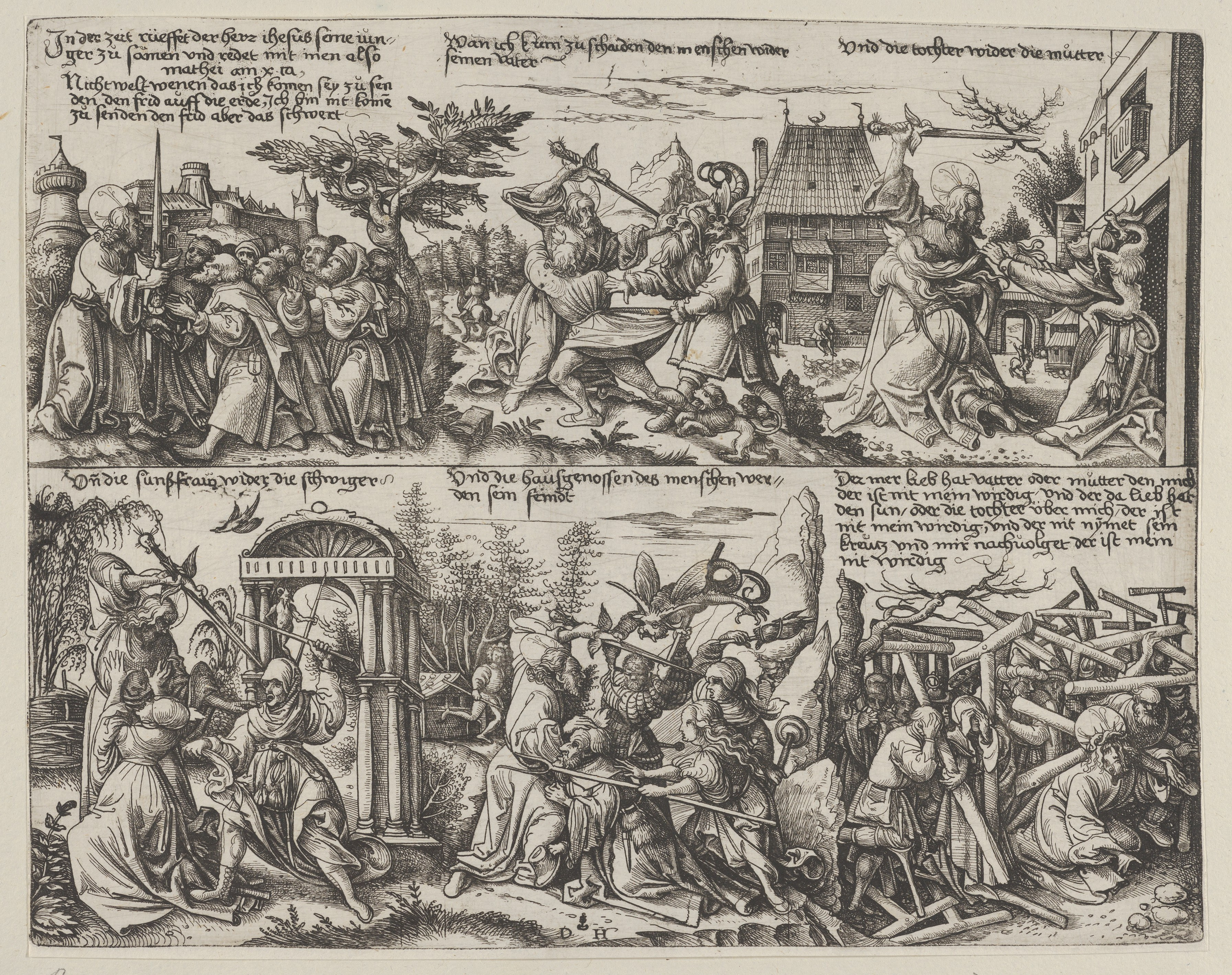
- "Scenes from Matthew 10:34-38", by Daniel Hopfer (1490–1536)
- Book: Gospel of Matthew
- Christian Bible part: New Testament

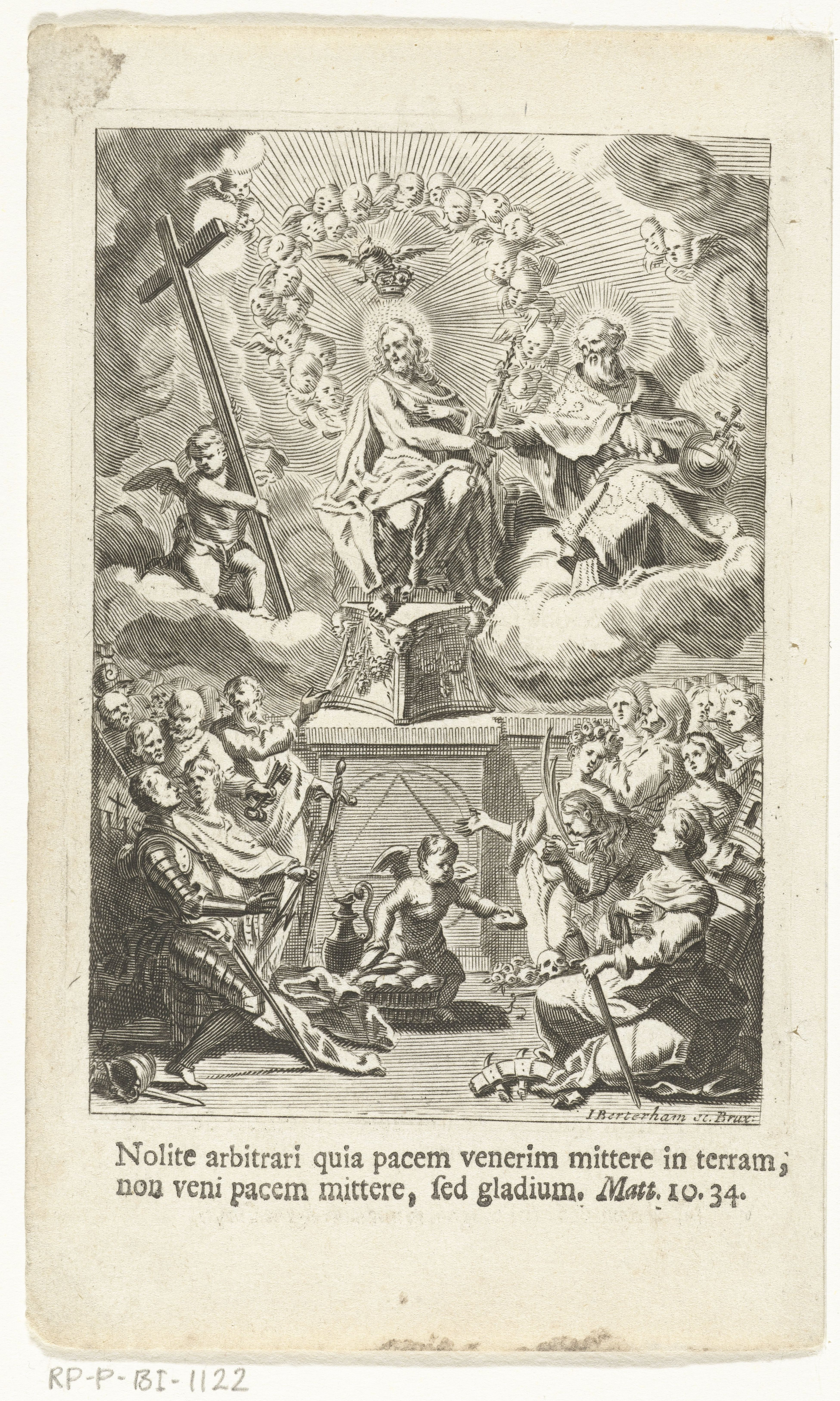
The Coronation and Adoration of Christ, by Jan Baptist Berterham, captioned with the text of Matthew 10:34.

Matthew 10:34 is the 34th verse in the tenth chapter of the Gospel of Matthew in the New Testament.

== Content ==
In the original Greek according to Westcott-Hort, this verse is:

Μὴ νομίσητε ὅτι ἦλθον βαλεῖν εἰρήνην ἐπὶ τὴν γῆν· οὐκ ἦλθον βαλεῖν εἰρήνην, ἀλλὰ μάχαιραν.

In the King James Version of the Bible the text reads:

Think not that I am come to send peace on earth: I came not to send peace, but a sword.

The New International Version translates the passage as:

"Do not suppose that I have come to bring peace to the earth. I did not come to bring peace, but a sword.

== Analysis ==
This wording seems to be at variance with Jesus' title of "Prince of Peace" (see Isaiah 9:6,7; 65:25). However, Lapide explains he comes to bring a spiritual peace of mind and a peace among the faithful, but not an earthly peace.

This is a much-discussed passage, often explained in terms of the "apocalyptic-eschatological" context of the 1st century.

R. T. France explains the verse, in context with the subsequent verse 35: "The sword Jesus brings is not here military conflict, but, as vv. 35–36 show, a sharp social division which even severs the closest family ties. … Jesus speaks here, as in the preceding and following verses, more of a division in men’s personal response to him."

The text of Matthew's Gospel in the Book of Kells alters gladium, the Vulgate translation of makhairan 'sword", to gaudium, 'joy', resulting in a reading of "I came not [only] to bring peace, but [also] joy".

== Commentary from the Church Fathers ==
Jerome: "He had before said, What I say to you in darkness, that speak ye in the light; He now tells them what will follow upon that preaching, saying, Think not that I am come to send peace upon earth; I am not come to send peace, but a sword."

Glossa Ordinaria: "Or connect it with what has gone before, As the fear of death ought not to draw you away, so neither ought carnal affection."

Chrysostom: "How then did He enjoin them, that when they should enter any house they should say, Peace be to this house, as also the Angels sung, Glory to God in the highest, on earth peace to men. (Luke 2:14) That is the most perfect peace when that which is diseased is lopped off, when that which introduces strife is taken away, for so only is it possible that heaven should be joined to earth. For so does the physician save the rest of the body, namely by cutting off that which cannot be healed. So it came to pass at the tower of Babel; a happy discord broke up their bad union. So also Paul divided those who were conspired together against him. For concord is not in all cases good; for there is honour among thieves. And this combat is not of His setting before them, but of the plots of the world."

== See also ==
- Live by the sword, die by the sword – Proverb found in the Christian Gospel of Matthew
- Sell your cloak and buy a sword – Instruction by Jesus to his disciples
- Swords into ploughshares – Converting weapons to peaceful civilian applications

Preceded by Matthew 10:33	Gospel of Matthew; Chapter 10	Succeeded by Matthew 10:35
