= Piacenza (disambiguation) =

Piacenza is a city in Italy.

Piacenza may also refer to:

== Places ==
- Province of Piacenza, a province in Italy
- Piacenza d'Adige, a town in Italy
- Piacenza, Wisconsin, an unincorporated community in the US

== People ==
- Mauro Piacenza, a prelate
- Domenico da Piacenza, dancing master
- Aymeric of Piacenza, Dominican scholar
- Saint Antoninus of Piacenza
- Antoninus of Piacenza (pilgrim)
- Mario Piacenza, explorer
- Ardoino da Piacenza, cardinal
- Conrad of Piacenza, nobleman

== Business ==
- Fratelli Piacenza fabric mill

== Sport ==
- Piacenza Calcio, a football club
- Pallavolo Piacenza, a volleyball team

== Historical events ==
- Battle of Piacenza
- Council of Piacenza

== Military units ==
- 103 Motorised Division Piacenza an infantry division of Italy of World War II

== Artifacts ==
- Liver of Piacenza

== See also ==
- Castelvetro Piacentino
- Carpaneto Piacentino
- San Giorgio Piacentino
- Ziano Piacentino
- Placentia (disambiguation)
