= Plaisance =

Plaisance may refer to:

== Places ==
=== Africa ===
- Plaisance, Mauritius, the location of Sir Seewoosagur Ramgoolam International Airport
- Plaisance, Seychelles, an administrative district on the island of Mahé

=== Americas ===
- Midway Plaisance Park, Chicago, Illinois, US
- Plaisance, Newfoundland and Labrador, or Placentia, Canada
- Plaisance, Quebec, Canada
- Plaisance National Park, Quebec, Canada
- Plaisance, Guyana
- Plaisance Arrondissement, Haiti
- Plaisance, Nord, Haiti
- Plaisance-du-Sud, Haiti
- Plaisance, Louisiana, US

=== Europe ===
- Neuilly-Plaisance, Seine-Saint-Denis, France
- Plaisance station, a Paris Metro station in Paris, France
- Plaisance, Aveyron, France
- Plaisance, Dordogne, France
- Plaisance, Gers, France
- Plaisance, Vienne, France
- Plaisance-du-Touch, Haute-Garonne, France
- Piacenza, Italy
- Plasencia, Spain

== People ==
- Plaisance of Gibelet (died 1217), wife of Prince Bohemond IV of Antioch
- Plaisance of Antioch (c. 1235/6–1261), Queen of Cyprus

== Other uses ==
- Plaisance (album), by Eddy Grant, 2017
- Plaisance School in Plaisance, Louisiana, US
