= Live by the sword, die by the sword =

Proverb found in the Christian Gospel of Matthew

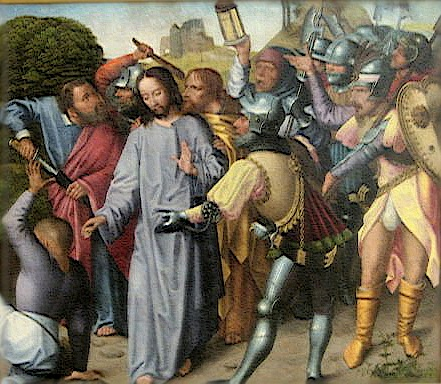
The Arrest of Christ (c. 1500) by the Master of the Evora Altarpiece, showing Jesus intervening after Peter cut off the ear of Malchus, servant of the high priest Caiaphas

Live by the sword, die by the sword is a proverb derived from the Gospel of Matthew (Matthew 26, 26:52): "Then said Jesus unto him, Put up again thy sword into his place: for all they that take the sword shall perish with the sword."

== Original biblical quotation ==
The phrase comes from Matthew 26:52, in which one of Jesus's disciples is described as having struck the servant of the High Priest of Israel and cut off his ear. Jesus is described as having rebuked him, saying:

Version	Text
Original Greek New Testament	τότε λέγει αὐτῷ ὁ Ἰησοῦς, Ἀπόστρεψόν σου τὴν μάχαιραν εἰς τὸν τόπον αὐτῆς· πάντες γὰρ οἱ λαβόντες μάχαιραν ἐν μαχαίρᾳ ἀπολοῦνται.
Latin Vulgate	Tunc ait illi Jesus: Converte gladium tuum in locum suum: omnes enim, qui acceperint gladium, gladio peribunt.
King James Version (KJV)	Then said Jesus unto him, "Put up again thy sword into his place: for all they that take the sword shall perish with the sword".
New Revised Standard Version (NRSV)	Then Jesus said to him, "Put your sword back into its place; for all who take the sword will perish by the sword".
New International Version (NIV)	"Put your sword back in its place", Jesus said to him, "for all who draw the sword will die by the sword".

The saying "all they that take the sword shall perish with the sword" is only found in the Gospel of Matthew and not in any of the other gospels. The Latin version refers to the weapon as a gladius, while the Greek version refers to it as a makhaira.

== Interpretations ==
Early Christian theologians were almost universally pacifists, with Justin Martyr, Hippolytus of Rome, Tertullian, and Origen all making strong statements against soldiering and bearing weapons.

According to St. John Chrysostom, when Jesus rebuked the unnamed disciple, it was a lesson that: "The disciples might accept meekly whatever befell him when they had learned that this also is occurring according to God’s will." Thus, contrary to the common proverbial understanding, St. John Chrysostom explains where there is God's will (not the will of men) there is no need to react in passion.

== History ==
A very similar line can be found in the Agamemnon, the first play of the Oresteia trilogy by the ancient Greek tragedian and playwright Aeschylus. The line, spoken by Queen Clytemnestra of Mycenae after she murders her husband King Agamemnon in an act of vengeance, is rendered in the original Greek and translated to English (with varying levels of similarity to the original) as:

Version	Text
Original Greek (Agamemnon, l. 1529)	ξιφοδηλήτῳ, θανάτῳ τίσας ᾇπερ ἦρχεν.
Trans. by R. C. Trevelyan	As he sinned by the sword, So is death by the sword his atonement.
Trans. by Dr. Timothy Chappell (The Open University)	He killed her by falsehoods, by falsehoods he dies as well.
Trans. by Robert Fagles (Princeton University)	“By the sword you did your work and by the sword you die.”
Trans. by Christopher Collard (The Queen's College, Oxford)	"[...] he has paid for just that deed, felled in death by the sword."

The line differs across translators and is variously understood as "an eye for an eye", emphasizing the irony or appropriateness of the means by which he was killed. The play, first performed in 458 BCE, remains popular to this day with regular performances and readings.

== References in popular culture ==
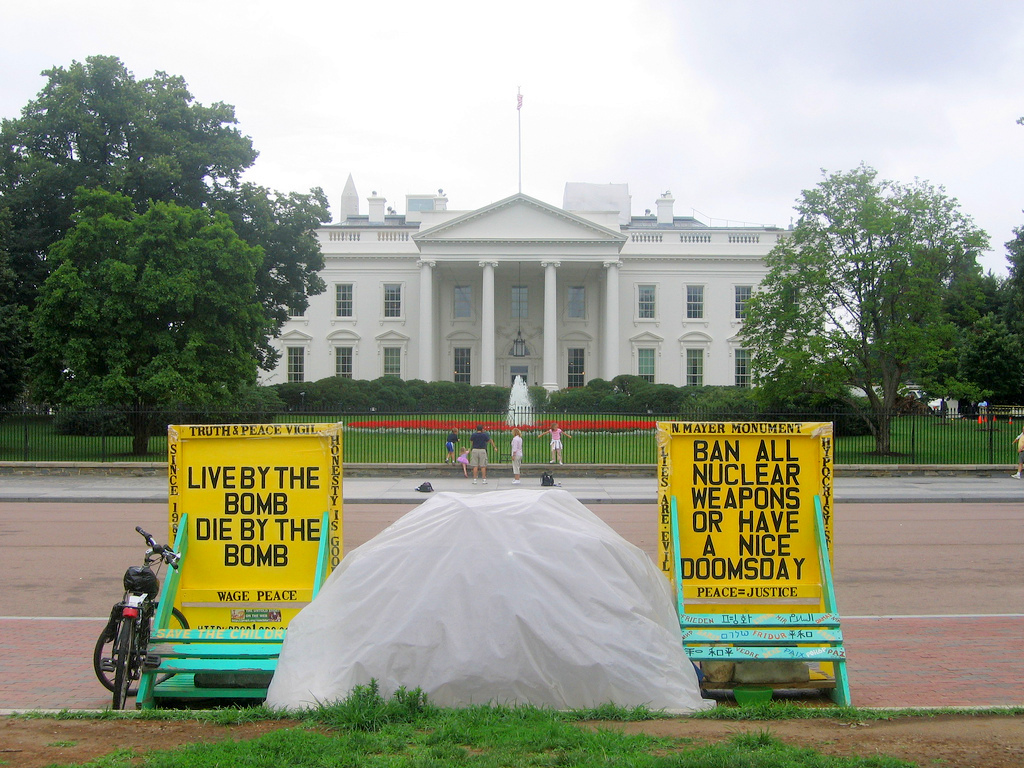
"Live by the bomb die by the bomb" at the White House Peace Vigil, started by Thomas in 1981.

- In the song "Night Moves" (1976) by Bob Seger, the singer mentions "Living by the Sword" in the third verse.
- In the song "Die by the Sword" by thrash metal band Slayer on their debut album Show No Mercy (1983), referenced in its title and in lyrics.
- In the song "Five Magics" by Megadeth on their 1990 album Rust in Peace, Mustaine uses the phrase "He who lives by the sword, will surely also die" referencing this quote.
- In the second verse of Geto Boys' song Mind Playing Tricks on Me (1991), the idiom is used to describe the violent life the protagonist leads.
- In the song "Live and Die" on the 1996 album Brown by Christian nu-metal band P.O.D., the idiom is used to describe the violent life the protagonist leads in joining the gang. The lyrics repeat toward the end of the song: "Live by the sword and die by the sword / Innocent life, what they dyin' for? / Live by the gat and die by the gun / Who suffers when it's all said and done?"
- Heavy metal band Saxon, included the song "To Live by the Sword" in their 2004 album Lionheart. The chorus goes: To live by the sword you must die by the sword.
- Heavy metal band Judas Priest, included the song "Sword of Damocles" in their 2014 album Redeemer of Souls. Its chorus goes: Truth will find its reward If you live and die by the sword.
- Heavy metal band Accept, included the song "Die by the Sword" in their 2017 album The Rise of Chaos. Its chorus reproduces the whole proverb: If you live by the sword, you will die by the sword.
- The song “Live By The Sword”, from hyperpop artist Dorian Electra's 2019 studio album, Flamboyant, is both named after the saying, and uses the saying in its hook.
- Jake Hill's song "By The Sword", released in 2020, references the phrase in its title and lyrics.
- The saying is paraphrased in the slogan "live by the bomb, die by the bomb" used in the White House Peace Vigil protest.

== See also ==
- Christian pacifism
- Lex Talionis
- Not peace but a sword
- Sell your cloak and buy a sword – Instruction by Jesus to his disciples
- Swords into ploughshares
- Violence begets violence
