= Giovanni Codagnello =

Italian notary and historian

The underlined text reads: a codagnello seriatim dicta iohanne – "by Codagnello, at the same time called John".

Giovanni Codagnello (c. 1154 – after 1235) was an Italian notary and historian.

== Life ==
Codagnello was born around 1154 in Piacenza. His surname was sometimes Latinized as Caputagni. Between 1199 and 1230, he is attested as a notary in documents from Piacenza and Cremona as both certifier and witness. He was for a time the pro tempore notary of the government of Piacenza. On 31 March 1202, he drew up a treaty of peace between, on the one side, Piacenza and Milan and, on the other, Pavia. In 1222, he witnessed a charter in Fiorenzuola d'Arda.

In 1226, Codagnello campaigned for the restoration of the Lombard League and Piacenza's joining it. He is best known for his collection of historical writings in Latin. Altogether these cover the history of the world from the Great Flood down to 1235. It is probable that Codagnello spent the years 1230–1235 working on his history and died not long after.

== Works ==
Codagnello identifies himself as the author and compiler in some verses at the beginning of his collection. The rest of the collection is in prose. It is contained in a single parchment manuscript, now in Paris, Bibliothèque nationale, MS lat. 4931. The manuscript is not the autograph but an early copy, made in Italy in the mid-13th century. It contains ten distinct texts, some authored or edited by Codagnello and others merely copied by him:

1. Liber rerum gestarum (folios 1a–55b)
  This is a mythical and legendary chronicle based in part on the Historia Romana and Historia Langobardorum of Paul the Deacon. It begins with a discourse on the ages of the world based on Augustine of Hippo, followed by the foundation of Troy. It contains legendary accounts of the founding of Piacenza and Milan and ends with an equally legendary account of Charlemagne's invasion of Spain. Georg Pertz gave this text the title Chronicon de sex aetatibus mundi ('chronicle of the six ages of the world'), but Codagnello says that "there are four ages: golden, silver, bronze and iron" (quatuor sunt etates: aurea, argentea, enea et ferrea).
2. Istoria qualiter translatum est imperium Romanum in Francia apud Teothonicos (folios 55b–56a)
  This is a short treatise on the translatio imperii.
3. Istoria Longobardorum (folios 56a–57a)
  This is a one-page epitome of Paul the Deacon's Historia Langobardorum.
4. a brief account of the conversion of Constantine and his move to Constantinople (folio 57a–c)
5. a notice of "a great sedition ... among people and knights" (sedicio magna ... inter populum et milites) that took place in Piacenza in 1090 (folios 57c–58b)
6. Libellus tristitie et doloris, angustie et tribulationis, passionum et tormentorum (folios 58b–70c)
  Codagnello's title translates "booklet of the sadness and pain, anguish and tribulation, suffering and torment". This is a revised version of an existing text, Narratio de Longobardie, edited by Codagnello to bring it in line with his Guelph views. He seems to have viewed Frederick I "through the prism" of the reigning emperor, Frederick II.
7. Annales Placentini (folios 70c–105c)
  This is a chronicle of 1031–1235 with a focus on Piacenza and Lombardy. It was based on earlier chronicles and some contemporary Milanese chronicles and in turn served as the basis for the later Ghibelline Chronicle of Piacenza. It contains phrases identical to those found in the treaty Codagnello drafted in 1202.
8. Gesta Federici in expeditione sacra (folios 105d–107c)
  This is an account of Frederick I's expedition on the Third Crusade, not written by Codagnello.
9. Gesta obsidionis Damiate (folios 107c–115c)
  This account of the siege of Damietta on the Fifth Crusade is usually attributed to Codagnello.
10. Summe legum Longobardorum (folios 115c–116b)
  This is a brief treatise on the Lombards, their arrival in Italy, the meaning of their name and their laws.

== Bibliography ==
- Arnaldi, Girolamo (1982). "Codagnello, Giovanni". Dizionario Biografico degli Italiani (in Italian). Vol. 26: Cironi–Collegno. Rome: Institute of the Italian Encyclopaedia. pp. 562–568. ISBN 978-88-12-00032-6.
- Bordini, Simone (2009). "La memoria di Ubertino Landi: Ricerche tra biografia e storiografia". In Roberto Greci (ed.). Studi sul medioevo emiliano: Parma e Piecenza in età comunale. Bologna: CLUEB. pp. 281–329.
- Busch, Jörg W. (1997). Die Mailänder Geschichtsschreibung zwischen Arnulf und Galvaneus Flamma: Die Beschäftigung mit der Vergangenheit im Umfeld einer oberitalienischen Kommune vom späten 11. bis zum frühen 14. Jahrhundert. Munich: Fink.
- Busch, Jörg W. (2001). "Sulle tracce della memoria comunale di Milano: Le opere dei laici del XII e XIII secolo nel Manipulus florum di Galvano Fiamma". In Paolo Chiesa (ed.). Le cronache medievali di Milano. Milan: Vita e Pensiero. pp. 79–88.
- Castignoli, P. (1986). "Giovanni Codagnello, notaio, cancelliere del comune di Piacenza e cronista". In E. Falconi; R. Peveri (eds.). Il Registrum magnum del comune di Piacenza. Milan. pp. 273–302.
- Cochrane, Eric (1981). Historians and Historiography in the Italian Renaissance. Chicago: University of Chicago Press.
- De Angelis, Gianmarco (2004). "Capere destruere et comburere: Lessico e forme della guerra negli Annales di Giovanni Codagnello" (PDF). Bollettino Storico Piacentino. 99 (2): 177–206.
- Dell'Aprovitola, Valentina; Hartmann, Florian (2016). "Codagnello, Giovanni". In Graeme Dunphy; Cristian Bratu (eds.). Encyclopedia of the Medieval Chronicle. Brill Online. doi:10.1163/2213-2139_emc_SIM_00742.
- Galbiati, Roberto (2020). "At Roncevaux without Roland: Giovanni Codagnello's Gesta Carli Francorum regis (1219–1222)". Zeitschrift für romanische Philologie. 136 (4): 934–951. doi:10.1515/zrp-2020-0052. hdl:2318/1797930. S2CID 227218402.
- Gatti, D. (1991). "Codagnello, Giovanni". In B. Andreolli; et al. (eds.). Repertorio della cronachistica emiliano-romagnola: secc. IX–XV. Rome. pp. 267–271.
- Holder-Egger, O. (1891). "Ueber die historischen Werke des Johannes Codagnellus von Piacenza". Neues Archiv der Gesellschaft für ältere deutsche Geschichtskunde. 16: 251–346, 475–509.
- Holder-Egger, O., ed. (1892). Gesta Federici I. Imperatoris in Lombardia. Monumenta Germaniae Historica, Scriptores rerum Germanicarum in usum scholarum. Vol. 27. Hanover: Hahn.
- Loud, Graham, ed. (2010). The Crusade of Frederick Barbarossa: The History of the Expedition of the Emperor Frederick and Related Texts. Farnham: Ashgate.
- Raccagni, Gianluca (2016). "The Crusade Against Frederick II: A Neglected Piece of Evidence" (PDF). The Journal of Ecclesiastical History. 67 (4): 721–740. doi:10.1017/S002204691600066X.
- Vasina, Augusto (2003). "Medieval Urban Historiography in Western Europe (1100–1500)". In Deborah Mauskopf Deliyannis (ed.). Historiography in the Middle Ages. Leiden: Brill. pp. 317–352.
- Witt, Ronald G. (2012). The Two Latin Cultures and the Foundation of Renaissance Humanism in Medieval Italy. Cambridge: Cambridge University Press.
