= Doctrine of the two swords =

Catholic exegetical analysis

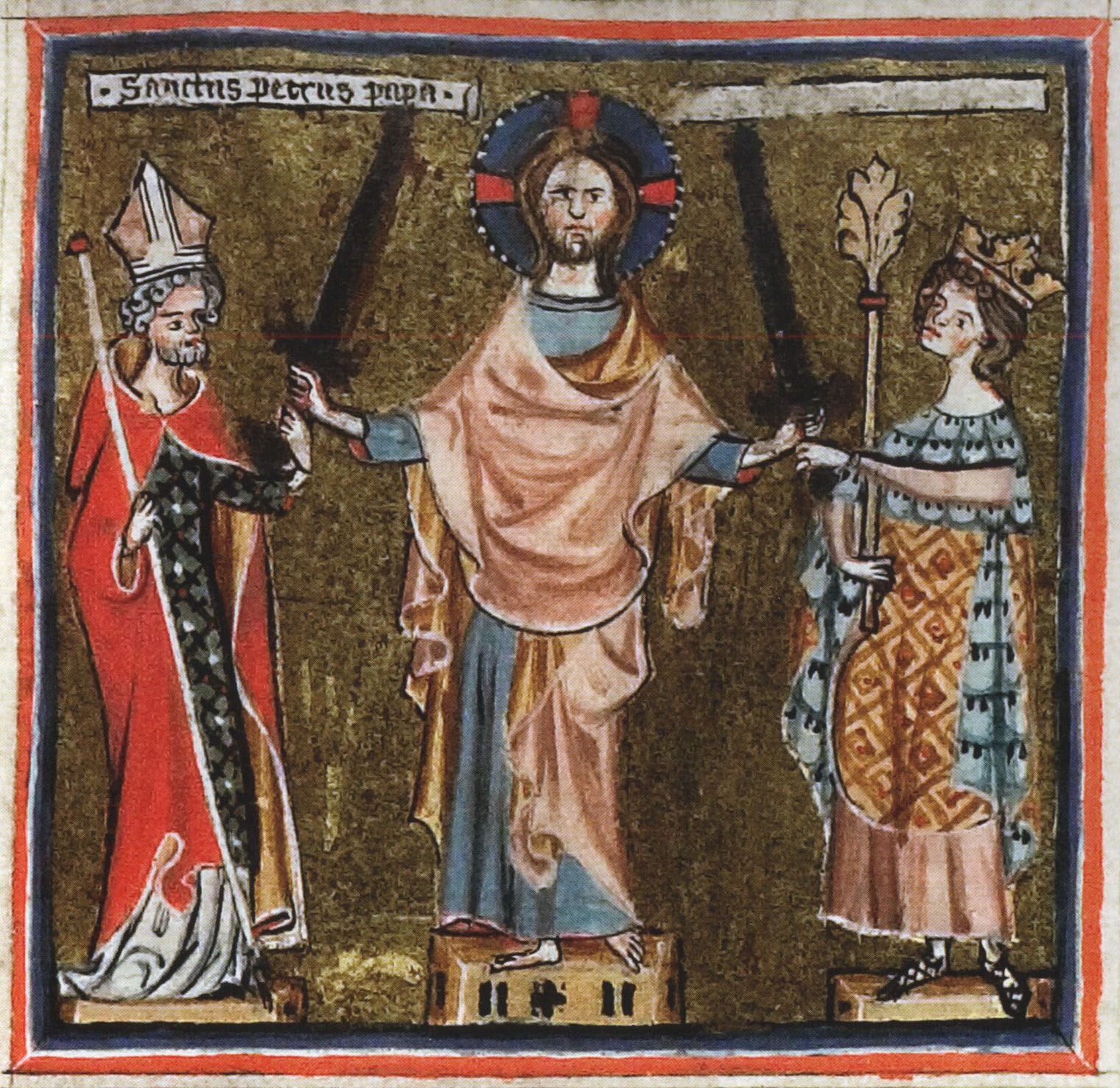
14th-century manuscript depicting Christ dispensing the two swords to the pope and the emperor.

In Catholicism, the doctrine (or theory) of the two swords is an exegesis of Luke 22:38 elaborated in the Middle Ages. It can be understood as a particular justification for the Gelasian doctrine of "the sacred authority of the priesthood and the royal power".

This particular exegesis of "here are two swords ... it is enough" was first put forward by Peter Damian in the 1060s. It was later taken up by Gottschalk of Aachen on behalf of the Emperor Henry IV (1056–1105) against the claims of Pope Gregory VII (1073–1085) during the Investiture Contest. In the 12th century, Bernard of Clairvaux, in his De consideratione, argued that both the "material sword" (gladius materialis) and the "spiritual sword" (gladius spiritualis) belonged ultimately to the Papacy.

By the early 13th century, the two swords were the subject of serious study and debate among canon lawyers and decretalists. The main question was whether Bernard was right. Had God given each sword to its rightful bearer, the Holy Roman Emperor and the Pope, or had he given both to the Pope, who then bestowed the material sword on the emperor? When Pope Gregory IX started the War of the Keys against Emperor Frederick II in 1228, it was on the basis of a claim to control both swords. In any case, however, churchmen could not bear actual swords; the material swords was to be wielded by laymen, even if under papal authority.

== See also ==
- Auctoritas
- Potestas
