= Sell your cloak and buy a sword =

Instruction by Jesus to his disciples

Sell your cloak and buy a sword is an instruction by Jesus to his disciples during the Last Supper which has been interpreted in several ways.

== Interpretation ==
=== Fulfillment of prophecy interpretation ===
Christian anarchist Jacques Ellul and Christian pacifist John Howard Yoder do not believe Luke 22:36 overturns the many times Jesus urged his followers to turn the other cheek and not resist evil when confronted by violence during his Sermon on the Mount and years of ministry. They show when the passage is taken in context (Luke 22:36-38), Jesus is also aware of fulfilling prophecy and makes a surprising statement that two swords are "enough."

Then He said to them, “But now, he who has a money bag, let him take it, and likewise a knapsack; and he who has no sword, let him sell his garment and buy one. For I say to you that this which is written must still be accomplished in Me: ‘And He was numbered with the transgressors.’ For the things concerning Me have an end.” So they said, “Lord, look, here are two swords.” And He said to them, “It is enough.”

— Gospel of Luke 22:36-38, NKJV

Ellul, Yoder and Archie Penner claim that two swords could not possibly have been "enough" to defend Jesus from his pending arrest, trial and execution, so their sole purpose must have been Jesus' wish to fulfill a prophecy (Isaiah 53:9-12). As Ellul explains:

The further comment of Jesus explains in part the surprising statement, for he says: "It is necessary that the prophecy be fulfilled according to which I would be put in the ranks of criminals" (Luke 22:36-37). The idea of fighting with just two swords is ridiculous. The swords are enough, however, to justify the accusation that Jesus is the head of a band of brigands. We have to note here that Jesus is consciously fulfilling prophecy. If he were not the saying would make no sense.

This theory is further substantiated by Peter when Peter draws one of the swords a few hours later at Jesus' arrest in the Garden of Gethsemane, slashing the ear of Malchus, one of the priests' servants, and Jesus rebukes him saying: "Put your sword back in its place," Jesus said to him, “for all who draw the sword will die by the sword."(Matthew 26:52)

Jamieson, Fausset and Brown, in their 1871 biblical commentary, indicate "...And He said to them, It is enough - not 'Two swords will suffice,' but 'Enough of this for the present'. The warning had been given, and preparation for coming dangers hinted at; but as His meaning had not been apprehended in the comprehensive sense in which it was meant, He wished to leave the subject".

Motyer, Stibbs and Wiseman in New Bible Commentary: Revised Third Edition (1977) states:

35-38- Finally, Jesus spoke of the new situation. Formerly, when the Disciples had gone out, on mission, they had not lacked anything. Now they would need a purse, a bag and even a sword. The saying is heavily ironical, for Jesus knew that now He would have to face universal opposition and be put to death. But the disciples misunderstood Him and produced weapons. 'That is enough', said Jesus to end a conversation which they had failed to understand. The way of Jesus, as they should have known, was not the way of the sword, but of love.

=== Figurative ===
Pope Boniface VIII referred to the two swords in the medieval papal bull Unam sanctam, to represent the temporal and spiritual authority of the church. He wrote: "We are informed by the texts of the gospels that in this Church and in its power are two swords; namely, the spiritual and the temporal. For when the Apostles say: "Behold, here are two swords" [Lk 22:38] that is to say, in the Church, since the Apostles were speaking, the Lord did not reply that there were too many, but sufficient."

Theologian John Gill said in his Exposition of the Entire Bible:

These words of Christ are not to be understood literally, that he would have his disciples furnish themselves with swords at any rate, since he would never have said, as he afterwards does, that two were sufficient; which could not be enough for eleven men; or have forbid Peter the use of one, as he did in a very little time after this: but his meaning is, that wherever they came, and a door was opened for the preaching of the Gospel, they would have many adversaries, and these powerful, and would be used with great violence, and be followed with rage and persecution; so that they might seem to stand in need of swords to defend them: the phrase is expressive of the danger they would be exposed to, and of their need of protection; and therefore it was wrong in them to be disputing and quarrelling about superiority, or looking out for, and expecting temporal pomp and grandeur, when this would be their forlorn, destitute, and afflicted condition; and they would quickly see the affliction and distress begin in himself. In "seven" ancient copies of Beza's, it is read in the future tense, "he shall take, he shall sell, he shall buy".

== See also ==
- Doctrine of the two swords
- Not peace, but a sword
- Swords into ploughshares
