= Ghibelline Annals of Piacenza =

Anonymous latin chronicle

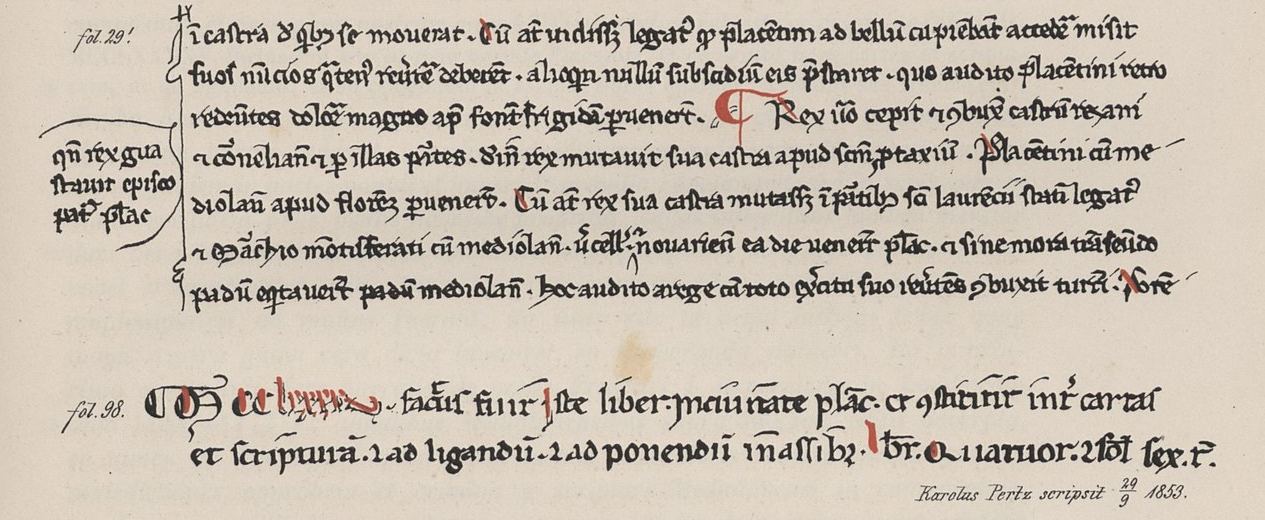
Selections from the Ghibelline Annals, printed with the MGH edition

The Ghibelline Annals of Piacenza is an anonymous Latin chronicle of Piacenza from 1154 to 1284.

It is known by several titles, all modern inventions. Georg Pertz called it the Annales Placentini Gibellini, while Alphonse Huillard-Bréholles called it the Chronicon Placentinum ('Chronicle of Piacenza').

The author of the Annals was a Ghibelline, that is, pro-Empire. He probably wrote anonymously because Piacenza was generally a Guelph city. It is likely that he was an associate of the Ghibelline Landi family. He was educated, cultured and probably a notary. For the period which they share in common, the Ghibelline Annals is a more subtle work than the Guelph Annals of Piacenza (1031–1235). Although the work is anonymous, Pertz identified the author with Muzio da Monza (died 1302), capitano del popolo of Piacenza in 1294 and accused of Ghibelline sympathies.

The Ghibelline Annals draws heavily on the earlier Guelph Annals as a source. It is not sectioned in any way, but is a continuous prose narrative. Neither is it purely local or regional in focus, although it is best informed about events in and around Piacenza. Parts of it are accounts of the deeds (gesta) of the Emperors Frederick I and Frederick II. The work is an especially valuable source for the 13th century.

The original manuscript from 1295 survives, now in London, Harleian 3678.

== Editions ==
- Huillard-Bréholles, A., ed. (1856). Chronicon de rebus in Italia gestis. Paris.
- Pallastrelli, B., ed. (1859). Monumenta historica ad provincias Parmensem et Placentinam pertinentia. Vol. 11. Parma. pp. 109–349.
- Pertz, G. H., ed. (1863). "Annales Placentini Gibellini". Monumenta Germaniae Historica, Scriptores. Vol. 18. Hanover. pp. 457–579.

== Bibliography ==
- Dell'Aprovitola, Valentina (2016). "Chronicon Placentinum 1154–1284". In Graeme Dunphy; Cristian Bratu (eds.). Encyclopedia of the Medieval Chronicle. Brill Online. doi:10.1163/2213-2139_emc_SIM_00624.
- Molinier, Auguste (1903). "Annales Placentini Gibellini (1154–1284)". Collections numériques de la Sorbonne. 3: 168–169.
- Raccagni, Gianluca (2016). "The Crusade Against Frederick II: A Neglected Piece of Evidence" (PDF). The Journal of Ecclesiastical History. 67 (4): 721–740. doi:10.1017/S002204691600066X.
- Whalen, Brett Edward (2019). The Two Powers: The Papacy, the Empire, and the Struggle for Sovereignty in the Thirteenth Century. University of Pennsylvania Press.
