= Guelph Annals of Piacenza =

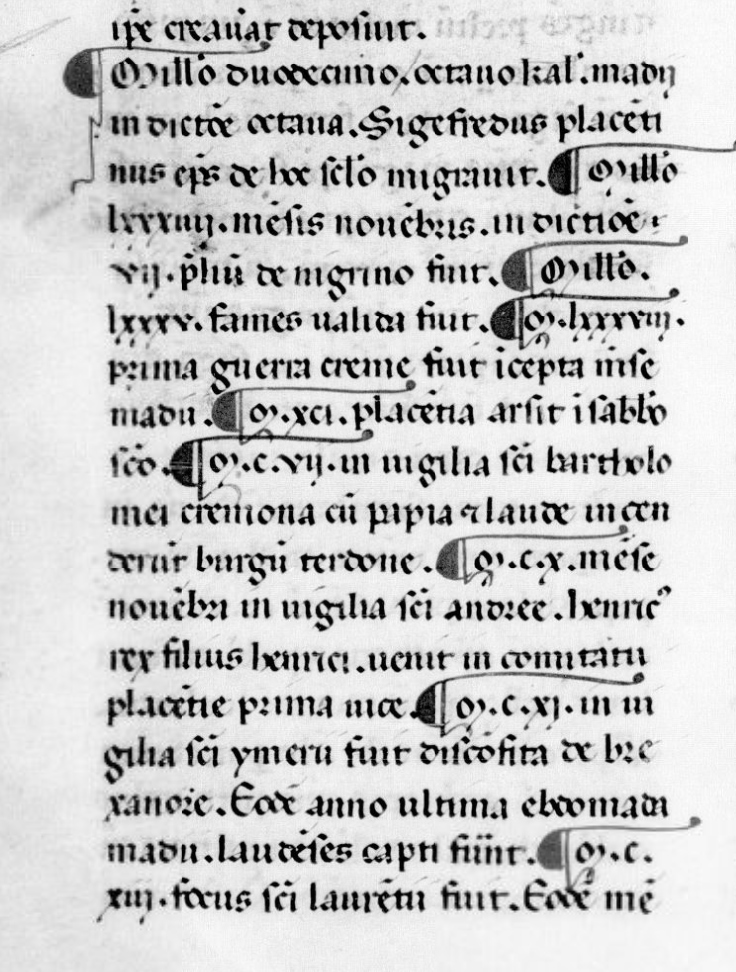
Start of the Annals

The Guelph Annals of Piacenza is a Latin chronicle of Piacenza and Lombardy for the years 1031–1235, written by Giovanni Codagnello.

The Annals is found in the manuscript Paris, Bibliothèque nationale, lat. 4931, at folios 70c–105c. The title of the work is a modern convention. Alphonse Huillard-Bréholles called the text the Chronicon Placentinum for his edition, while for his Georg Pertz called it the Annales placentini guelfi to distinguish it from the chronicle he called Annales placentini gibellini. The name "annals" is less accurate than the qualifier "Guelph". The Annals is a substantial narrative history, more properly called a chronicle.

The first annalistic entry—the death of Bishop Siegfried—is erroneously dated to 1012, when it in fact took place in 1031. The Annals is certainly written from a Guelph perspective, typical of the city of Piacenza. The Guelphs opposed the efforts of the Holy Roman Emperors to increase their power in the kingdom of Italy. They supported the Lombard League and the Papacy against the emperors. Codagnello is known to have campaigned for the restoration of the league in 1226.

== Editions ==
- Huillard-Bréholles, A., ed. (1856). "Chronicon Placentinum". Chronicon de rebus in Italia gestis. Paris. pp. 1–106.
- Pallastrelli, B., ed. (1859). Monumenta historica ad provincias Parmensem et Placentinam pertinentia. Vol. 11. Parma. pp. 1–108.
- Pertz, G. H., ed. (1863). "Annales Placentini Guelfi". Monumenta Germaniae Historica, Scriptores. Vol. 18. Hanover. pp. 411–457.
- Holder-Egger, O., ed. (1901). Scriptores rerum Germanicarum in usum scholarum. Monumenta Germaniae Historica. Vol. 13. Hanover. pp. 3–116.

== Bibliography ==
- Arnaldi, Girolamo (1982). "Codagnello, Giovanni". Dizionario Biografico degli Italiani (in Italian). Vol. 26: Cironi–Collegno. Rome: Institute of the Italian Encyclopaedia. pp. 562–568. ISBN 978-88-12-00032-6.
- Dell'Aprovitola, Valentina; Hartmann, Florian (2016). "Codagnello, Giovanni". In Graeme Dunphy; Cristian Bratu (eds.). Encyclopedia of the Medieval Chronicle. Brill Online. doi:10.1163/2213-2139_emc_SIM_00742.
- Raccagni, Gianluca (2016). "The Crusade Against Frederick II: A Neglected Piece of Evidence" (PDF). The Journal of Ecclesiastical History. 67 (4): 721–740. doi:10.1017/S002204691600066X.
- Whalen, Brett Edward (2019). The Two Powers: The Papacy, the Empire, and the Struggle for Sovereignty in the Thirteenth Century. University of Pennsylvania Press.
