= Ichil =

13th century Chagatai nobleman

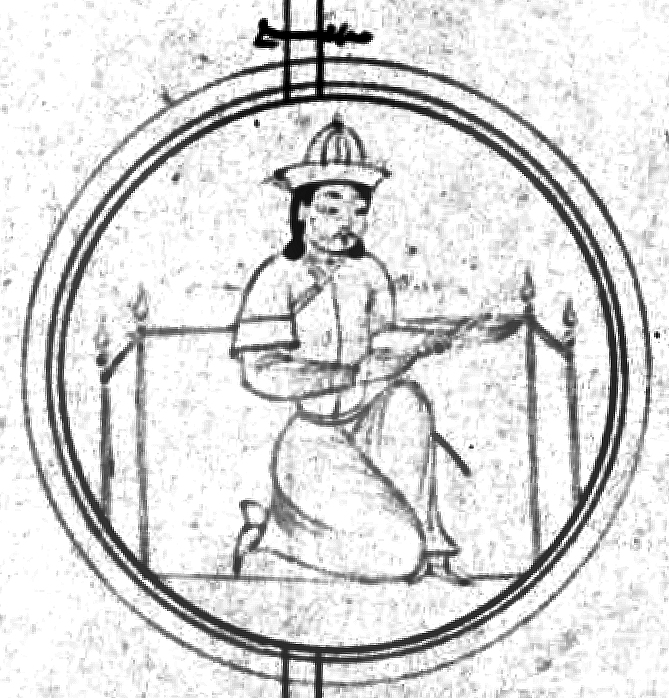
Ichil from the Baysunghur Album, c.15th century

Ichil or Ijil was a 13th-century Mongol nobleman of the Chagatai Khanate. Contemporary sources have limited mention of him. However, due to being listed among the ancestors of the Central Asian conqueror Timur, he and his family's activities were potentially subject to significant embellishment by subsequent Timurid works.

A member of the Barlas tribe, very little is known about Ichil. A manuscript of the Jami' al-tawarikh by Rashid al-Din Hamadani, copied in Baghdad in 1317, states that he served under the Chagatai prince Teguder and that he was “a great amir in the service of Abaqa”. This suggests that Ichil was part of the Chagatai contingent that participated in the Mongol conquest of Persia under Hulegu Khan, and then later transferred into Ilkhanate service after Teguder's revolt in 1267. However, historian John Woods suggests that these statements regarding Ichil, not mentioned in any other copy of the Jami' al-tawarikh, may potentially have been forgeries inserted into the Baghdad manuscript at a later date.

Subsequent Timurid sources expanded on Ichil. The Shajarat al-atrak, often attributed to Ulugh Beg, states that he succeeded his father Qarachar as generalissimo of the Chagatai Khanate, serving under the Khans Alghu and Mubarak Shah. According to Sharaf al-Dīn Yazdi’s Zafarnama, it was after participating in the enthronement ceremonies of the Khan Baraq that Ichil joined Teguder's service. Yazdi continues that Ichil's son Aylangir took over his responsibilities in the Chagatai Khanate following the former's relocation to Persia, though Hafiz-i Abru states it was Ichil's other son Qutlugh Qiya who had migrated to Persia and not Ichil himself. Both Yazdi and Abru write that Aylangir, upon his succession, caused the Khanate to flourish.
