= Qarachar Noyan =

Mongol military commander

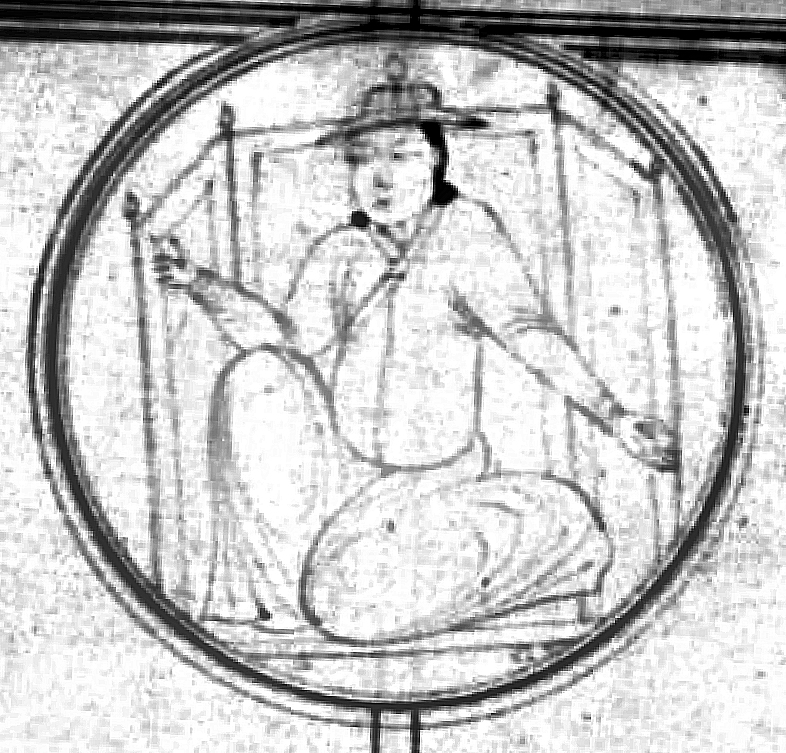
Qarachar Noyan from the Baysunghur Album, c.15th Century

Qarachar Noyan (Note: Noyan, roughly translated as "lord", acted as both a military and civil title and was somewhat equivalent to the Islamic title emir.) (c.1166 – 1243/44 or 1255/56), also spelt Karachar, was a Mongol military commander under Genghis Khan as well as a paternal ancestor of Timur, founder of the Timurid Empire.

Though there is little mention of him in early sources, where he is only described as a military official, the link Qarachar provided between the Mongol Empire and the Timurid dynasty was paramount to the latter's foundational history. His role and that of his relations were thus heavily expanded and potentially mythologised by Timurid court historians, who portrayed him as a hereditary supreme commander and administrator endowed with a unique intimacy with the ruling clan. This disparity in information results in the actual details regarding his life and position becoming matters of dispute among modern academics.

== Life ==
=== Pre-Timurid sources ===
Qarachar features very little in the histories contemporary to his lifetime. In The Secret History of the Mongols, he is mentioned alongside his father, Suqu Sechen ("the Sage"), as having attended the assembly which proclaimed Genghis Khan (then called Temüjin) ruler of the Mongols in 1190. Having belonged to the Mongol Barlas tribe, the two acted as one of the delegations representing the group at the event. The Secret History also states that in 1206, Qarachar was given command of a thousand by the emperor. According to the thirteenth-century historian Juvayni, Qarachar later had a base in Taloqan from which, in 1222, he marched on Merv to suppress a rebellion. By 1227, the year that Genghis died, Qarachar and his contingent had been assigned to the retinue of Genghis Khan's second son Chagatai, a transfer which is also mentioned in the works of Rashid-al-Din Hamadani.

=== Timurid sources ===
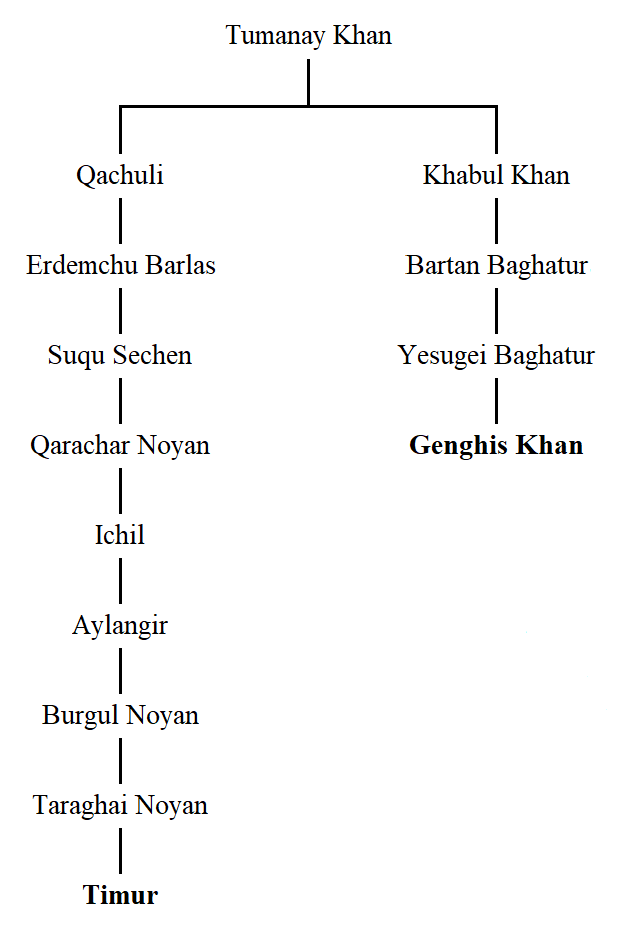
The genealogical relationship between Timur and Genghis Khan, according to Timurid sources

Later Timurid historians, such as Sharaf ad-Din Ali Yazdi in his Zafarnama and Hafiz-i Abru in his Majma and Zubdat, greatly elaborated on the origins of the dynasty, including on the life and background of Qarachar. In such works, his ancestry (which is never clarified in earlier accounts) is said to link to that of Genghis Khan. His paternal grandfather was stated to be Erdemchu Barlas, son of Qachuli, himself a son of Tumanay Khan, Genghis Khan's great-great-grandfather. This relationship is expressed in other works as well as engraved on Timur's cenotaph and tombstone in the Gur-e-Amir, in Samarkand, Uzbekistan. Qarachar's father Suqu Sechen was depicted as having been a trusted advisor of Yesugei, Genghis Khan's father, having been present at the latter's birth and foretelling the infant's future greatness. Suqu is claimed by Yazdi to have died shortly after Yesugei while their children were still young, though this would contradict The Secret History, which states that he was still alive in 1190.

Qarachar was described as being among the earliest tribal leaders to swear allegiance to Genghis Khan. He was given a command of 10,000 and advised the emperor frequently throughout his decades-long conquests. Qarachar was depicted as being consulted at critical junctures, and as having unhorsed Ong Khan during the final battle against the Keraites.

As Genghis Khan was dying, he is recounted to have summoned his sons and brothers as well as Qarachar. There, after having received their homage, he praised the wisdom of the latter and urged his sons to follow his council and commands. Genghis Khan then ordered the division of his empire among his progeny, bestowing to his second son Chagatai the lands of Transoxiana, which would later become the Chagatai Khanate. In continuation of a covenant made between their respective great-grandfathers Qachuli and Qabul, (Note: This covenant was said to have been based on a vision had by Qarachar's great-grandfather Qachuli. He dreamt that he saw four stars emerge from the breast of his sleeping twin Qabul, one after the other, with the fourth being brightest. He then saw seven emerge similarly from his own breast, followed by a great star which shone much brighter than the others. He relayed his dreams to their father Tumanay Khan, who interpreted the first to mean that the initial paramountcy would belong to Qabul's descendants, with the fourth in succession to him being a great conqueror (presumably Genghis Khan). The second dream portended that the eighth in descent from Qachuli would also be a great ruler (referencing Timur). Tumanay Khan then called on both his sons to swear solemn oaths and establish the covenant, whereby sovereignty would remain with Qabul and his line, while Qachuli's would hold administrative and military authority, thus establishing an agreement of dual kingship. Historian Vasily Bartold dismissed the story as a "fantastic legend" invented centuries later to support Timur's rights to authority.) he commended this son to Qarachar's care, who was also entrusted with the administration and armies to manage on his behalf. This arrangement was formalised by the legal adoption by the nobleman of Chagatai, whose daughter Qarachar also married, so as to establish a "bond of fatherhood and sonship". It was from this marriage that Timur claimed descent. (Note: Yazdi describes Taghachar, a son-in-law of Genghis Khan who was killed during the siege of Nishapur, as a younger brother to Qarachar. Since Taghachar's background is vague in Mongol sources, historian İlker Binbaş suggests that Yazdi invented the relationship in order to provide further marital links between Qarachar and the Imperial family.)

Yazdi records that Qarachar subsequently occupied a prominent position in the Chagatai court, performing the actual duties of ruling while the Khan revelled and hunted. This arrangement is mentioned by other Timurid historians such as Hafiz-i Abru, who states that as generalissimo, he undertook matters of law, rule and custom. Natanzi in his Muntakhab further relates that after Chagatai's death in 1241, Qarachar was given command of the household under his successor Qara Hülegü. The Mu'izz al-Ansab, a genealogical work from the reign of Shah Rukh, also adds that he carried out legal decisions based on the laws set out by Genghis Khan (the Yassa).

The year of his death is disputed between accounts. Hafiz-i Abru states that Qarachar survived Chagatai by only a year, with his death occurring in 640 AH (1243/44 CE). Conversely, Yazdi narrates that he had outlived the Khan by thirteen years, dying in 652 AH (1255/56 CE) at the advanced age of eighty-nine. Depending on the source, he may have had up to nineteen sons, with his descendants forming seven of the Barlas clans of Turkestan and Transoxiana. Qarachar's position of generalissimo was bequeathed to his son Ichil (Timur's great-great-grandfather), with the office becoming hereditary among his descendants.

== Historicity ==
The first historian to question the narratives presented by Timurid histories was Constantine d'Ohsson in 1834, who stated that they were falsified, with the character of Qarachar being an invention due to an apparent lack of mention in the works of Rashid-al-Din Hamadani. This assumption was later disproved by Vasily Bartold, who discovered a comment by Hamadani regarding Qarachar. However, he was only described as being one of Chagatai's military chiefs as opposed to an all-powerful vizier, leading to an implication that his position and exploits had been greatly exaggerated. This is a view shared by Yuri Bregel, who adds that there is no evidence that Qarachar enjoyed any special power.

Zeki Velidi Togan attempted to dispute this claim, revealing that early versions of Hamadani's Jami' al-tawarikh contain two mentions of Qarachar's son Ichil, who was stated by the Timurids to have inherited Qarachar's premier position. Togan also states that the general importance of the Barlas among the Chagatai tribes was proved by the influential marriages made by Timur and his sisters prior to the former's ascension. His findings are confirmed by the writings of Jean of Sultaniyya and Clavijo. Beatrice Forbes Manz argues that this does not prove that the Barlas were the most important tribe in the khanate, which is the suggested view of the Timurid histories. Such influence, she states, would have led to marriages between the imperial clan and the Barlas, of which there is no evidence of from the time of Qarachar to Timur. In relation to this, Eiji Mano adds that while he believes that the tribe had a shared origin with Genghis Khan, by Timur's time the Barlas had become relatively unimportant. He further says that Qarachar's position likely did not exceed that of a Majordomo.

John E. Woods extensively discussed the matter of Timur's ancestry, including Qarachar, and stated his belief that the conqueror had manipulated his genealogy for political means. Woods relates that as a non-member of the imperial clan, Mongol law dictated that Timur was unable to rule under his own name, instead being forced to make use of a puppet-Chagatai Khan. This arrangement was solemnised by the marriages of himself and his sons with Mongol princesses. However, other regional warlords, many of whom were Timur's rivals, also used similar tactics to support their own authority. To justify his own paramountcy being more legitimate, Woods argues that Timur used the genealogical traditions of Qarachar to suggest that he had a hereditary right to govern the khanate. Such a position therefore diminished his opponents to usurpers to the will of Genghis Khan. This view was made clear in Nizam al-din Ali Shami's version of the Zafarnama, which portrays that Timur "revived the house of Chagatai" by enthroning his puppet-Khan, thus vindicating the trust Genghis Khan had placed in Qarachar.

However, Maria Subtelny contends that the exalted position ascribed to Qarachar does in fact have basis in Mongol tradition. She notes that Woods did not take into account that the Yuan Shih, the official history of the Yuan dynasty, specifically mentions that the Barlas belonged to the imperial guard corps, the Kheshig. These corps, which combined the roles of an elite military division, imperial bodyguards and supervisors of the imperial household, were a central institution for the Mongols, under whom the leadership was hereditary. Subtenly suggests that based on the Timurid descriptions of Qarachar's duties under Chagatai Khan, it can be deduced that he would have been the head of the latter's personal division of the Kheshig. She therefore believes that the contingent of Qarachar which had been assigned to Chagatai by Genghis Khan, unspecified in Mongol histories, would have been this division. She further states that since members of the corps were traditionally given administrative roles, this would tie in with the influence in government attributed to Qarachar. Subtenly specifically identifies his position as the yarghuchi (chief judge), given his association with legislative powers mentioned in the Mu'izz al-Ansab. Thus Qarachar's military, administrative and legislative functions would be explained by his positions as yarghuchi and head of the Kheshig. She posits that the Kheshig role is not explicitly acknowledged in Timurid sources because it was a "submerged" institution, finding little mention in post-Mongol Persian works, which instead prefer circumlocutions.

== Bibliography ==
- Bartold, Vasily Vladimirovich (1928), Turkestan Down to the Mongol Invasion (Second ed.), London: Luzac & Co., ISBN 978-0-906094-00-6
- Bartold, Vasilii Vladimirovitch (1963), Four Studies on the History of Central Asia, vol. 2, Brill Archive
- Binbaş, İlker Evrim (2016), Intellectual Networks in Timurid Iran: Sharaf al-Dīn 'Alī Yazdī and the Islamicate Republic of Letters, Cambridge University Press, ISBN 978-1-107-05424-0
- Boyle, John Andrew (1963), "The Mongol commanders in Afghanistan and India according to the Tabaqāt-i Nāsiri of Jūzjānī'", Islamic Studies, 2 (2), Islamabad: Islamic Research Institute, International Islamic University, JSTOR 20832685
- Bregel, Yuri (1982), Marcel Erdal (ed.), "Tribal Tradition and Dynastic History: The Early Rulers of the Qongrats according to Munis", Asian and African Studies, 16 (3), Israel: The Institute of Middle Eastern Studies, University of Haifa
- Ghiasian, Mohamad Reza (2018), Lives of the Prophets: The Illustrations to Hafiz-i Abru's "Assembly of Chronicles", BRILL, ISBN 978-90-04-37722-6
- Haidar, Mansura (2004), Indo-Central Asian relations: from early times to medieval period, Manohar, ISBN 978-81-7304-508-0
- Jackson, Peter (2023), From Genghis Khan to Tamerlane: The Reawakening of Mongol Asia, Yale University Press, ISBN 978-0-300-27504-9
- Keene, H. G. (2001) [1879], The Turks in India (Reprinted ed.), The Minerva Group, Inc., ISBN 978-0-89875-534-3
- Mano, Eiji (1976), "Amir Timur Kuragan – Timur ke no keifu to Timur no tachiba", Toyosho-Kenkyu, 34 (4)
- Manz, Beatrice Forbes (1999), The Rise and Rule of Tamerlane, Cambridge University Press, ISBN 978-0-521-63384-0
- d'Ohsson, Constantin Mouradgea (1834), Histoire des Mongols, vol. 2, The Hague: Les Frères van Cleef
- Sneath, David (2007), The Headless State: Aristocratic Orders, Kinship Society, & Misrepresentations of Nomadic Inner Asia, Columbia University Press, ISBN 978-0-231-14054-6
- Subtelny, Maria (2007), Timurids in Transition: Turko-Persian Politics and Acculturation in Medieval Iran, BRILL, ISBN 978-90-04-16031-6
- Togan, Zeki Velidi (1955), S. M. Abdullah (ed.), "Tahqiq-i nasab-i Amir Timur", Professor Mohamed Shafi Presentation Volume, Lahore
- Woods, John E. (1990a), "Timur's Genealogy", in Martin Bernard Dickson; Michel M. Mazzaoui; Vera Basch Moreen (eds.), Intellectual Studies on Islam: Essays Written in Honor of Martin B. Dickson, University of Utah Press, ISBN 978-0-87480-342-6
- Woods, John E. (1990b), The Timurid dynasty, Indiana University, Research Institute for Inner Asian Studies
