= Battle of Irtysh River (13th century) =

Battle of the Mongol Empire

- Part of the Mongol campaigns in Siberia
Date	Late 1208 or very early 1209 CE
Location	Irtysh in northeast Kazakhstan, at the junction with the Bukhtarma near the Altai Mountains 49.6°N 83.8°E
Result	Mongol victory

Belligerents
Mongol Empire; Oirats	Merkit; Naimans

Commanders and leaders
Jochi; Qutuqa Beki	Toqto'a Beki †; Kuchlug

Strength
Unknown	Unknown, possibly as many as 30,000

Casualties and losses
Unknown	Heavy, approximately half the total force

The Battle of the Irtysh River or Battle Along the Buqdarma was a battle between the Mongol Empire and remnants of the Merkit and Naimans, fought at the junction of the Bukhtarma with the Irtysh in late 1208 or very early 1209. The Merkit had a longstanding rivalry with the Borjigin, the family of Genghis Khan, and together with the Naimans opposed Genghis Khan's rise to power. The Battle of Chakirmaut in 1204 shattered the forces of the Merkit-Naimans alliance and the survivors fled into southern Western Siberia. When Jochi, the son of Genghis, led an expedition into Siberia to subjugate what the Mongols called the "Forest Peoples", he encountered the remnant armies of the Merkits and Naimans at the Irtysh and soundly defeated them, shattering the alliance. The Merkit commander Toqto'a was slain and the Naiman leader Kuchlug fled.

== Background ==
=== Borjigin–Merkit rivalry ===
The rivalry between the Borjigin Mongols and the Merkits began after Yesugei, a significant chief in the Khamag Mongol confederation, kidnapped Hö'elün from her Merkit husband, Chiledu, on their way home from their wedding, and married her himself. Decades later, Temujin, the son of Yesugei and Hö'elün, married Börte. Soon after, Börte was kidnapped by the Merkit as revenge for the kidnapping of Hö'elün. Temujin managed to rescue her, with the help of his friend Jamukha and the Keraite ruler Toghrul. As Temujin rose to power, Jamukha and Toghrul came to oppose him. Their opposition culminated in an alliance of Jamukha's forces with the Keraite, the Merkit, and the Naimans. The Keraite were defeated in 1203. The Naimans, supported by Merkit, were defeated in the Battle of Chakirmaut in 1204, and the Merkit were again defeated in 1205 at Qaradal Huja'ar. Jamukha was also defeated and captured in 1205. The Merkit and Naimans who survived the battles against the Mongols fled into Western Siberia, where they eventually gathered at the Irtysh. Temujin's victory against the alliance consolidated his control of the Mongol and Turkic tribes in the region. In 1206, he was elected the khan of the new Mongol Empire and given the name Genghis Khan. The Qo'as faction of the Merkit opted to surrender to Genghis Khan and Qulan, the daughter of Dayir Usun, leader of the Qo'as Merkit, married Genghis Khan.

=== Invasion of Siberia ===
Among the first military efforts of the consolidated empire was a campaign into Siberia. The presence of the Merkit and Naimans there posed a threat to the new empire, and Genghis did not give them long to foment opposition. The other goal was to subjugate what the Mongols referred to as the "Forest People". Jochi, the oldest son of Genghis, led the expedition. The Oirat leader Qutuqa Beki, who previously had opposed Genghis, met Jochi's army and submitted to the empire, giving it 10,000 soldiers.

== Battle ==
Qutuqa Beki guided Jochi's campaign in tracking the Merkits and Naimans. After going through the Ulun Pass, they met the Merkits and Naimans at the Bukhtarma branch of the Irtysh. The exact date when they encountered and battled them is unclear, occurring in either late 1208 or very early 1209. The combined forces of the Naiman and Merkit possibly numbered as many as 30,000. The Mongols won the engagement, shattering the Merkit-Naiman alliance. The Merkit commander Toqto'a was killed in action by an arrow, and many of his soldiers drowned in the river attempting to flee. Toqto'a's sons Qudu, Qaltoqan, Cila'un, and Majar, and the Naiman commander Kuchlug, escaped. Unable to bring Toqto'a's body with them, they cut off his head and carried it with them.

== Aftermath ==
The surviving Merkit fled west, first to the Uyghurs and then, after the Uyghurs allied with the Mongols, to Cumania; the Naiman leader Kuchlug fled south to Qara Khitai. In 1211, Kuchlug usurped the throne of Qara Khitai and took over the dynasty. Seven years later, the Mongols invaded Qara Khitai and defeated and executed Kuchlug. At some point likely between 1209 and 1219, most likely 1217 or 1218, Jochi, Subutai, Tuqachar, and possibly were dispatched to deal with the remaining Merkit, and them and Tuqachar, along with a Uyghur force, met and destroyed the Merkit at the Chem River, in what is present-day western Kazakhstan. The surviving sons of Toqto'a, possibly including Qudu, escaped to what is now northern Kazakhstan, but were pursued and defeated by Subutai. Either prior to or after a defeat of the Merkit–Qangli alliance at the Chem, the Mongol defeated the Merkit at the Chu. The Merkit were conclusively beaten at either a point between the Khemchik and Yenisei or, if the Chu battle succeeded the Chem campaign, at the Jade Valley near the Chu.
