= Suqu Sechen =

12th-century Mongol of the Barlas tribe associated with Genghis Khan

Suqu Sechen (Note: Also spelt 'Sughu Chichin' or 'Sughu - jijan'. 'Sechen' translates to "the sage" or "wise".) (c. 12th century) was a Mongol of the Barlas tribe and a paternal ancestor of the 14th century conqueror Timur.

In regards to contemporary records, Suqu Sechen is absent from Rashid al-Din's Jami' al-tawarikh, and only has a single mention in the Secret History of the Mongols. There, alongside his son Qarachar, he is described as leading one of the two delegations of the Barlas in the tribal assembly of 1190, which proclaimed the future Genghis Khan ruler of the Mongols. However, no further information is provided for which of the various Barlas groups he and Qarachar may have represented.

While both the Jami' al-tawarikh and the Secret History trace differing (legendary) common ancestries between Genghis Khan and the Barlas tribe as a whole, neither work mentions Suqu Sechen in the lineages specifically. However, subsequent Timurid writings, such as the Mu'izz al-Ansab and Yazdi's Zafarnama, have him as a great-grandson of Tumanay Khan, a paternal ancestor of Genghis Khan. The Zafarnama identifies Suqu Sechen as the most notable among the twenty-nine sons of Erdemchi Barlas, (Note: Also spelt 'Erdemchu Barula'.) though only provides the names of three other sons; Tudan, Yüge and Bakalkay. (Note: The Mu'izz al-Ansab lists one hundred and sixty individuals across six generations descending from these three brothers, not including the progeny of Suqu Sechen; many of these were contemporary with Timur and his offspring. It continues that the issue of Suqu Sechen, Yüge and Bakalkay had formed the Barlas tribe sent under Qarachar with Chagatai Khan on the formation of the latter's Khanate.)

The Zafarnama continues that Suqu Sechen had been a trusted advisor of Genghis Khan's father Yesugei, as well as a pillar of his rule. He is described as being present during Genghis Khan's birth, and as having foretold the latter's future greatness. The Zafarnama states that Suqu Sechen and Yesugei died within days of each other, with the former leaving a number of minor orphans, including Qarachar and his brother Taghachar. (Note: Historian İlker Evrim Binbaş suggests that this relationship with Taghachar was an invention by Yazdi.) However, this contradicts the Secret History, according to which Suqu Sechen, having attended the 1190 tribal assembly, had outlived Yesugei by at least fifteen years. Historian Peter Jackson suggests that Yazdi was attempting to absolve Suqu Sechen of any responsibility for failing to rescue the young Genghis Khan, who had been cast adrift alongside his mother and brothers following Yesugei's death.

== Bibliography ==
- Abu'l-Fazl (1907). The Akbarnama of Abu'l-Fazl. Vol. I. Translated by Henry Beveridge. Calcutta: The Asiatic Society.
- Binbaş, İlker Evrim (2016). Intellectual Networks in Timurid Iran: Sharaf al-Dīn 'Alī Yazdī and the Islamicate Republic of Letters. Cambridge University Press. ISBN 978-1-107-05424-0.
- Jackson, Peter (2023). From Genghis Khan to Tamerlane: The Reawakening of Mongol Asia. Yale University Press. ISBN 978-0-300-27504-9.
- Onon, Urgunge (2005). The Secret History of the Mongols: The Life and Times of Chinggis Khan. Routledge. ISBN 978-1-135-79556-6.
- Woods, John E. (1990a), "Timur's Genealogy", in Martin Bernard Dickson; Michel M. Mazzaoui; Vera Basch Moreen (eds.), Intellectual Studies on Islam: Essays Written in Honor of Martin B. Dickson, University of Utah Press, ISBN 978-0-87480-342-6
- Woods, John E. (1990b). The Timurid dynasty. Indiana University, Research Institute for Inner Asian Studies.
