= Mongol campaigns in Central Asia =

Series of military campaigns (1209–1236)

Mongol invasion of Central Asia
- Part of the Mongol invasions and conquests
Date	1209–1236
Location	Xinjiang, Central Asia, Afghanistan
Result	Mongol victory
Territorial changes	Mongol Empire gains control of most of Central Asia

Belligerents
Mongol Empire; Qocho; Karluks	Merkit; Naimans; Qara Khitai Khanate; Cumania	Khwarazmian Empire

Commanders and leaders
Genghis Khan; Jochi; Chaghatai; Ögedei; Tolui; Subutai; Jebe; Jelme (POW); Muqali; Qubilai Barlas; Qarachar Noyan; Taghachar †; Qasar; Bo'orchu †; Sorkin-shara; Barchuq Art Tegin; Arslan Khan; Ozar	Kuchlug (executed); Qudu	Muhammad II of Khwarazm # Jalal al-Din Mangburni †; Inalchuq (executed); Timur Malik

Strength
100,000–150,000	Around 100,000	40,000+ men

Casualties and losses
Around 50,000+	60,000–70,000 soilders	1.25 million killed (25% - 35% of the population)

The Mongol Empire conducted several campaigns in Central Asia after the unification of the Mongol and Turkic tribes on the Mongolian Plateau in 1206. Smaller military operations included the destruction of surviving Merkit and Naimans (which involved forays into Cumania) and the conquest of Qara Khitai. These were followed by a major campaign against Khwarazm. Expansion into Central Asia began in 1209 as Genghis Khan sent an expedition to pursue rivals who had fled to the region and threatened his new empire. The Uyghur kingdom Qocho and leaders of the Karluks submitted voluntarily to the Mongol Empire and married into the imperial family. By 1218 the Mongols controlled all of Xinjiang and by 1221 all the territories of the former Khwarazmian Empire. In 1236, the Mongols defeated the eastern portions of Cumania and swept into Eastern Europe.

== Destruction of the Merkit–Naiman alliance (1209) ==
The Merkit had a long-standing feud with the Borjigin clan to which Temujin, the future Genghis Khan, belonged. They and the Naimans opposed the rise of Genghis Khan. They joined with the forces of Jamukha and Toghrul to oppose Temujin in the Battle of Chakirmaut in 1204. Temujin defeated the alliance, and the surviving Merkit and Naimans fled into Western Siberia, where they eventually gathered at the Irtysh. Temujin's victory against the alliance consolidated his control of the Mongol and Turkic tribes in the region. In 1206, he was elected the khan of the new Mongol Empire and given the name Genghis Khan. In either late 1208 or early 1209, as part of the conquest of Siberia, a Mongol expedition commanded by Genghis Khan's oldest son, Jochi, met the Merkits and Naimans at a branch of the Irtysh. The Merkit commander Toqto'a was killed in action, and many of his soldiers drowned in the river attempting to flee.

The Merkits and Naimans who survived the battle regrouped at the Chu but were again defeated. The surviving Merkit fled first to the Uyghurs approaching Turpan. After the Uyghurs allied with the Mongols, they fled west, past Qara Khitai to the Qangli Kipchaks of Cumania. The Naiman leader Kuchlug fled south to Qara Khitai. The Merkit might have accompanied him briefly, but soon made their way further west.

== Submission of the Uyghurs and Karluks (1209-1211) ==
The initial contact with, and legacy of, the Mongol Empire with Central Asia was peaceful and not destructive, as the empire's nearest neighbors in Eastern Turkestan tenured their submission to the Mongols voluntarily. After their defeat at the Battle of the Irtysh, the surviving Merkit, led by Qudu, fled to the territory of the Uyghur kingdom of Qocho. However, the ruler, Barchuq Art Tegin, was chafing at the increasing demands from Qara Khitai and killed both the Merkit envoys sent to him as well as the viceroy of the Qara Khitai. In 1209, Barchuq voluntarily joined the Mongol Empire, making the Uyghurs one of the first Turkic groups to do so. To solidify the alliance, Al Altun, the youngest daughter of Genghis Khan and his chief consort Börte, was married to Barchuq. Their submission was perhaps unexpected, as the presence of the Mongol armies in the region might have had such submission as a goal in addition to pursuing Genghis's rivals. The Uyghur contributed administrative and linguistic expertise to Mongols, in exchange for their military protection. Because they submitted voluntarily, they were granted vassal status. Barchuq was allowed to operate independently, and his kingdom contributed 18,000 troops to the Western campaigns, including the conquest of Qara Khitai, Khwarazm, and Western Xia, and participating in the Battle of the Chem against surviving Merkit.

In 1211, the Karluks, a Turkic confederation the area of the southern Ili, in the Tarbagatai Mountains and northern Xinjiang, also voluntarily submitted to the Mongols. The ruler Arslan Khan married a junior daughter of Genghis Khan, who possibly went by the name Töre or Tolai. Arslan commanded six thousand men. Another Karluk leader, Ozar of Almaliq, married a daughter of Jochi. He commanded an unknown number of soldiers. Because the Karluks submitted voluntarily like the Uyghur, their military was allowed to operate as an auxiliary without integrating into the main, atomized army. By 1218, the Mongol Empire controlled all of what is present-day Xinjiang.

== Destruction of the Merkit–Qangli alliance (c. 1209–1219) and invasion of the Kipchak (1236) ==
At some point likely between 1209 and 1219, most likely 1217 or 1218, General Subutai was dispatched to deal with the Merkit survivors and he, Jebe, and Tuqachar, likely joined in force with a Uyghur army, met the Merkit at the Chem River, in what is present-day western Kazakhstan, and destroyed them. The Merkit and Qangli Kipchak allies who survived fled to what is now northern Kazakhstan. Jebe and Subutai pursued and defeated them. Either prior to or after a defeat of the Merkit–Qangli alliance at the Chem, the Mongol defeated the Merkit at the Chu. The Merkit were conclusively beaten at either a point between the Khemchik and Yenisei or, if the Chu battle succeeded the Chem campaign, at the Jade Valley near the Chu. At this juncture, Jebe and Subutai did not attempt to incorporate the Qangli into the empire. Having completed their destruction of the Merkit, they returned home. The independent nomadic tribes that the Mongols had encountered in Central Asia and Eastern Europe may have been at least part of the impetus for Ögedei Khan to launch a western campaign in 1235. In 1236, the westward expansion of Batu Khan, the son of Jochi, smashed into the Kipchaks, beginning an invasion of Europe, and incorporated the Kipchak lands in Central Asia, Eastern Europe, and Western Siberia into his appanage, which became known as the Golden Horde.

== Qara Khitai (1216–1218) ==
The Qara Khitai (Western Liao) was founded by remnants of the Liao dynasty. The dynasty dominated Central Asia in the 12th century after it defeated the Seljuk Empire at the Battle of Qatwan in 1141. However, the dynasty's power was shattered in 1211 through the combined actions of the Khwārezm-Shah ʿAlāʾ ad-Dīn Muḥammad (1200–20), and Küchlüg, a fugitive Naiman prince fleeing from the Mongols. Kuchlug was given shelter by the Qara Khitai, but he usurped the throne in 1211.

Kuchlug attacked the Karluk city of Almaliq, and the Karluks appealed to Genghis Khan for help. In 1216, Genghis dispatched his general Jebe to pursue Kuchlug. The Mongols defeated the Qara Khitai at Balasaghun. Kuchlug fled, but was killed in 1218 after his capture in Badakhshan in modern-day Afghanistan.

== Khwarezmia (1219–1221) ==
In 1218, the Khan sent a large caravan of Mongol merchants to Khwarazmia; it seems probable that a large proportion of the Mongol elite had invested in the expedition, and thus had a personal interest in its success. However, Inalchuq, the governor of the Khwarazmian city of Otrar, seized the caravan's goods and executed its members on charges of espionage. The validity of the accusations has been debated, as has the Shah's involvement; it is certain, though, that he rejected the Khan's subsequent demands that Inalchuq be punished, going so far as to kill one Mongol envoy and humiliate the other two. This was seen as a grave affront to the Khan himself, who considered ambassadors "as sacred and inviolable" as the Great Khan himself. He abandoned his war against the Jin, leaving only a small army to pursue it, and gathered as many men as possible to invade Khwarazmia.
