= Military of the Mongol Empire =

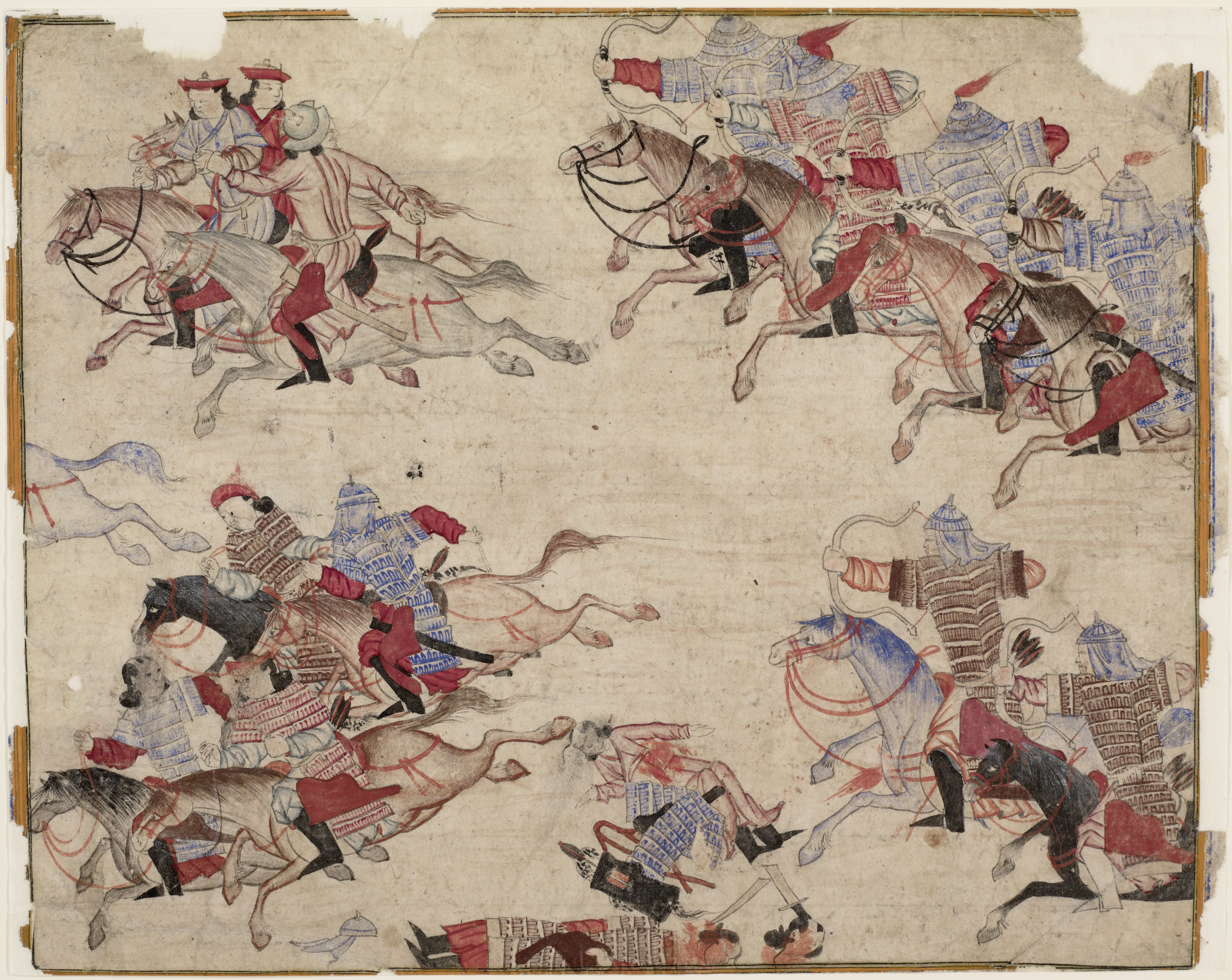
14th-century depiction of Mongol warriors in lamellar armour, on Mongolian ponies and using unique cavalry techniques, pursuing their enemy.

During the Mongol invasions and conquests, which began under Genghis Khan in 1206–1207, the Mongol army conquered most of continental Asia, including parts of West Asia, and parts of Eastern Europe, with further (albeit eventually unsuccessful) military expeditions to various other regions including Japan, Indonesia and India. The efforts of Mongol troops and their allies enabled the Mongol Empire to become the contemporarily largest polity in human history. Today, the former Mongol Empire remains the world's largest polity to have ever existed in terms of contiguous land area and the second-largest polity overall, behind only the British Empire.

== Cavalry ==
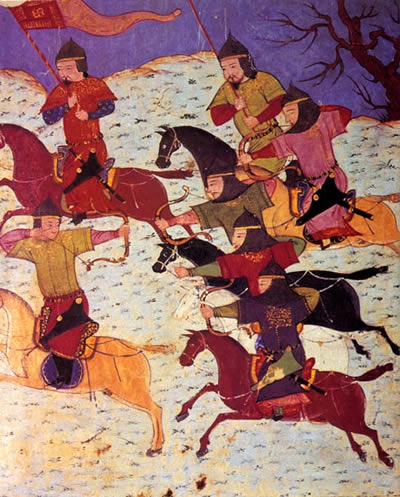
Mongol cavalry archery from Rashid-al-Din Hamadani's Universal History using the Mongol bow.

Each Mongol soldier typically maintained three or four horses. Changing horses often allowed them to travel at high speed for days without stopping or wearing out the animals. When one horse became tired, the rider would dismount and rotate to another. By letting a tired horse keep up with the rest of the herd without a load, the strategy preserved mobility without overburdening the animal. The Mongols protected their horses in the same way as they did themselves, covering them with lamellar armor. Horse armor was divided into five parts and designed to protect every part of the horse, including the forehead, which had a specially crafted plate that was tied on each side of the neck.

== Armor ==
Lamellar armor was worn over thick coats. The armor was composed of small scales of iron, chain mail, or hard leather sewn together with leather thongs and could weigh 10 kilograms (22 lb) if made of leather alone and more if the cuirass was made of metal scales. The leather was first softened by boiling and then coated in a crude lacquer made from pitch, which rendered it waterproof. Sometimes, the soldier's heavy coat was simply reinforced with metal plates.

Helmets were cone shaped and composed of iron or steel plates of different sizes and included iron-plated neck guards. The Mongol cap was conical in shape and made of quilted material with a large turned-up brim, reversible in winter, and earmuffs. Whether a soldier's helmet was leather or metal depended on his rank and wealth.

== Weapons ==
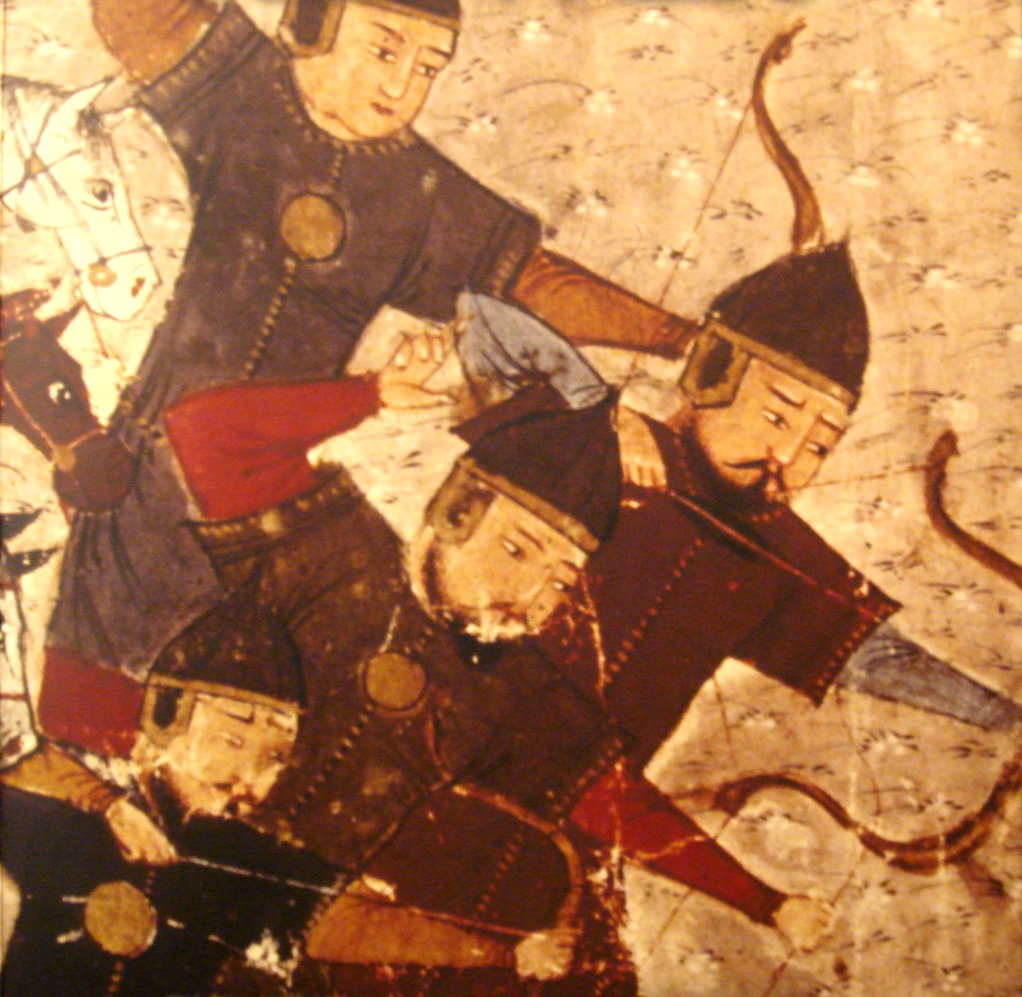
Mongol soldiers using bow, in Jami al-Tawarikh by Rashid al-Din, BnF. MS. Supplément Persan 1113. 1430–1434 AD.

Mounted archers were a major part of the armies of the Mongol Empire, for instance at the 13th-century Battle of Liegnitz, where an army including 20,000 horse archers defeated a force of 30,000 troops led by Henry II, Duke of Silesia, via demoralization and continued harassment.

=== Mongol bow and crossbow ===
The primary weapon of the Mongol forces was their composite bows made from laminated horn, wood, and sinew. The layer of horn is on the inner face as it resists compression, while the layer of sinew is on the outer face as it resists tension. Such bows, with minor variations, had been the main weapon of steppe herdsmen and steppe warriors for over two millennia; Mongols (and many of their subject peoples) were skillful archers. Composite construction allows a powerful and relatively efficient bow to be made small enough that it can be used easily from horseback.

Quivers containing 60 arrows were strapped to the backs of their cavalrymen and to their horses. Mongol archers typically carried 2 to 3 bows (one heavier and intended for dismounted use, the other lighter and used from horseback) that were accompanied by multiple quivers and files for sharpening their arrowheads. These arrowheads were hardened by plunging them in brine after first heating them red hot.

The Mongols could shoot an arrow over 200 metres (660 ft). Targeted shots were possible at a range of 150 or 175 metres (492 or 574 ft), which determined the tactical approach distance for light cavalry units. Ballistic shots could hit enemy units (without targeting individual soldiers) at distances of up to 400 metres (1,300 ft), useful for surprising and scaring troops and horses before beginning the actual attack. Shooting from the back of a moving horse may be more accurate if the arrow is loosed in the phase of the gallop when all four of the horse's feet are off the ground.

The Manchus forbade archery by their Mongol subjects, and the Mongolian bowmaking tradition was lost during the Qing dynasty. The present bowmaking tradition emerged after independence in 1921 and is based on Manchu types of bow, somewhat different from the bows known to have been used by the Mongol Empire. Mounted archery had fallen into disuse and has been revived only in the 21st century.

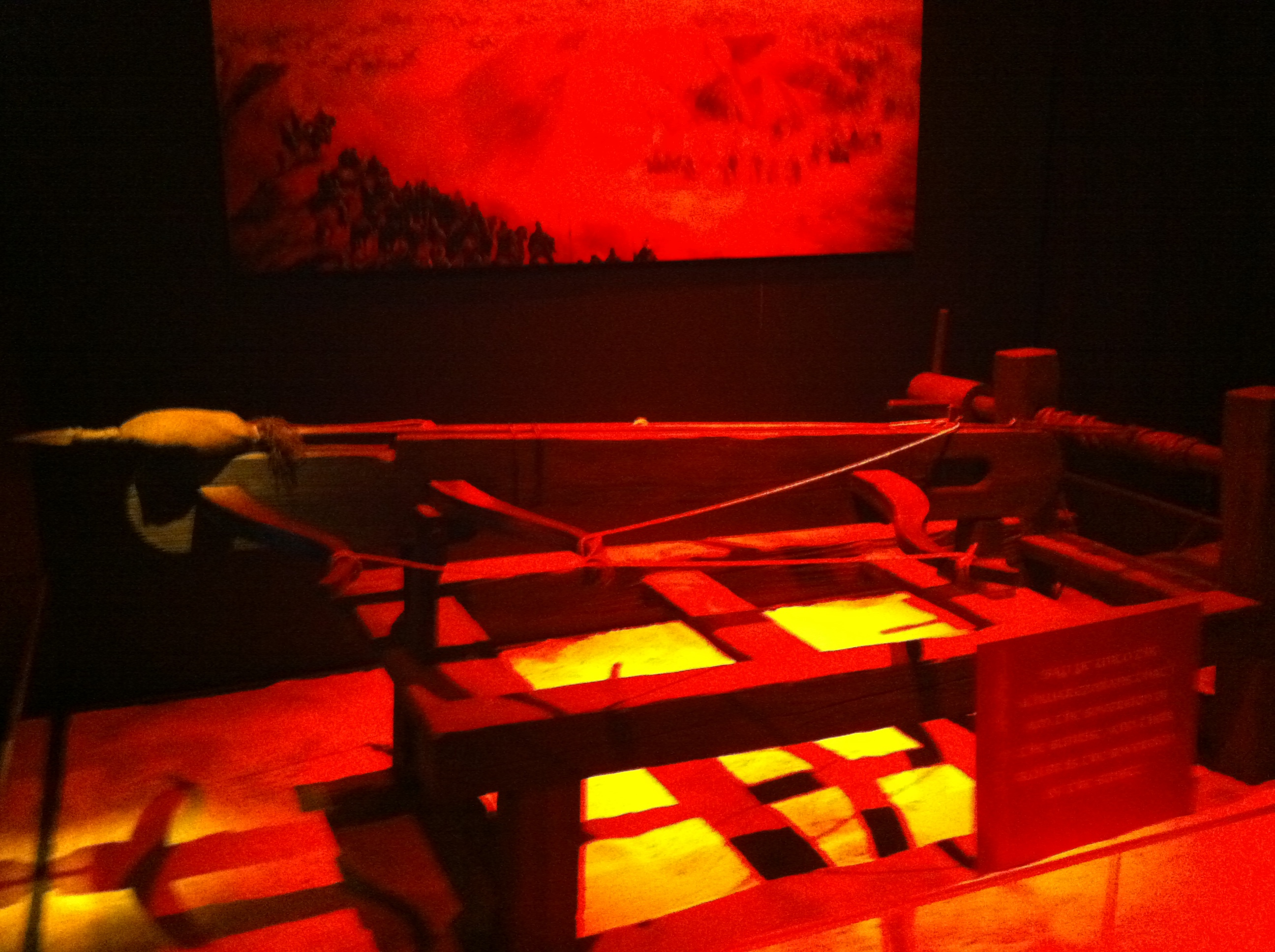
Triple-Bow Siege Crossbow

The Mongols have also used crossbows (possibly acquired from the Chinese), also both for infantry and cavalry, but these were rarely used in battle. During the Siege of Nishapur in 1221, the Mongols used thousands of siege machines, crossbows, and other equipment against Khwarazmian troops. In the Battle of Xiangyang, both the Song and Mongol forces used siege crossbows against each other. According to Juvayni, Hulagu Khan brought with him 3,000 giant crossbows from China, for the siege of Nishapur, and a team of Chinese technicians to work a great 'ox bow' shooting large bolts a distance of 2,500 paces, which was used at the siege of Maymun Diz.

=== Gunpowder ===
the Mongol Empire was the first to use gunpowder, but it was not created by them

==== Song dynasty ====
As the song dynasty starts it was blocking the Mongols' passage south of the Yangtze were the twin fortress cities of Xiangyang and Fancheng. What resulted was a siege that lasted from 1268 to 1273. For the first three years, the Song defenders had been able to receive supplies and reinforcements by water; but, in 1271, the Mongols set up a full blockade with their navy, isolating the two cities. A relief convoy led by Zhang Shun and Zhang Gui ran the blockade. They commanded a hundred paddle-wheel boats. Despite travelling by night, they were discovered early on by the Mongols. When the Song fleet arrived near the cities, they found the Mongol fleet to have spread themselves out along the entire width of the Yangtze without any gaps. A chain was stretched out across the water. The two fleets engaged in combat, and the Song opened fire with fire-lances, fire-bombs and crossbows. The Song forces suffered heavy casualties trying to cut through the chains using axes, pulling up stakes and hurling bombs. They ultimately succeeded in reaching the city walls but in 1273, the Mongols enlisted the expertise of two Muslim engineers, one from Persia and one from Syria, who helped in the construction of counterweight trebuchets. These new siege weapons resulted in the surrender of Xiangyang in 1273.

During the siege of Shaoyang in 1274, the Mongol general Bayan waited for the wind to change to a northerly course before ordering his artillerists to bombard the city with molten metal bombs, which caused such a fire that "the buildings were burned up and the smoke and flames rose up to heaven." Shaoyang was captured and its inhabitants massacred. Bayan used bombs again in 1275 during the siege of Changzhou before storming the walls and massacring the inhabitants due to their refusal to surrender.

==== Europe and Japan ====
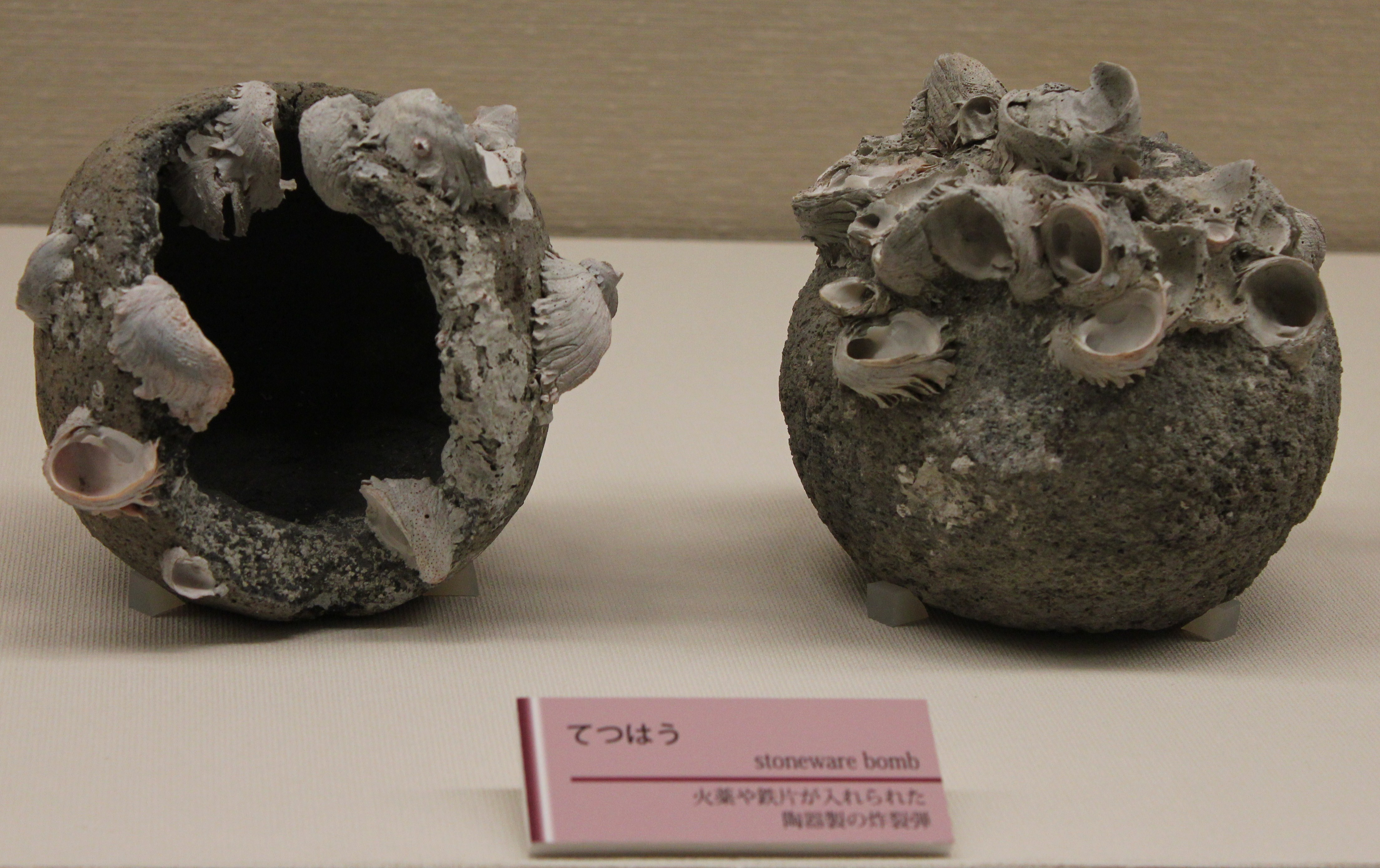
Stoneware bombs, known in Japanese as Tetsuhau (iron bomb), or in Chinese as Zhentianlei (thunder crash bomb), excavated from the Takashima shipwreck, October 2011, dated to the Mongol invasions of Japan (1271–1284 AD).

Gunpowder may have been used during the Mongol invasions of Europe. "Fire catapults", "pao", and "naphtha-shooters" are mentioned in some sources. However, according to Timothy May, "there is no concrete evidence that the Mongols used gunpowder weapons on a regular basis outside of China."

Shortly after the Mongol invasions of Japan in the late 13th century, the Japanese produced a scroll painting depicting a bomb. Called tetsuhau in Japanese, the bomb is speculated to have been the Chinese thunder crash bomb. Japanese descriptions of the invasions also talk of iron and bamboo pao causing "light and fire" and emitting 2–3,000 iron bullets.

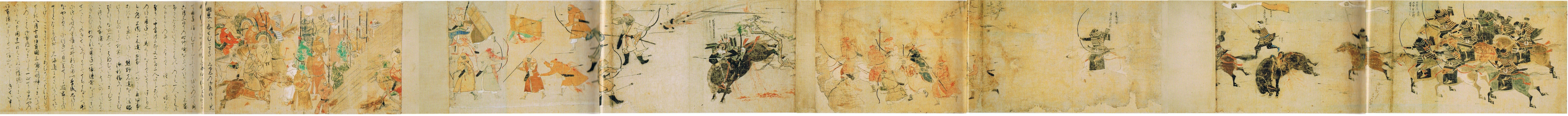
The samurai Takezaki Suenaga facing Mongol and Korean arrows and bombs.

== Kharash ==
A commonly used Mongol tactic involved the use of the kharash. The Mongols would gather prisoners captured in previous battles and would drive them forward in sieges and battles. These "shields" would often take the brunt of enemy arrows and crossbow bolts, thus somewhat protecting the ethnically Mongol warriors. Commanders also used the kharash as assault units to breach walls.

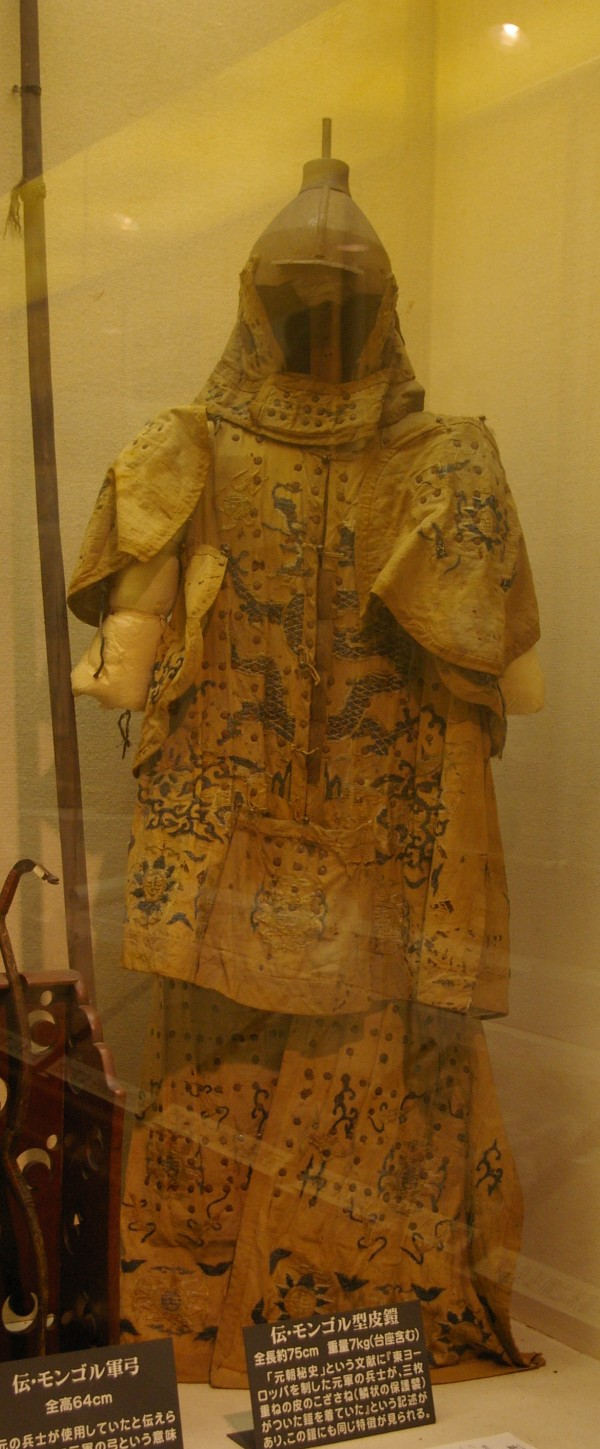
Helmet and armour of a Mongol Yuan warrior during the Mongol invasion of Japan

As they were conquering new people, the Mongols integrated into their armies the conquered people's men if they had surrendered – willingly or otherwise. Therefore, as they expanded into other areas and conquered other people, their troop numbers increased. Exemplifying this is the Battle of Baghdad, during which many diverse people fought under Mongol lordship. Despite this integration, the Mongols were never able to gain long-term loyalty from the settled peoples that they conquered.

== Communication ==
The Mongols established a system of postal-relay horse stations called örtöö, for the fast transfer of written messages. The Mongol mail system was the first such empire-wide service since the Roman Empire. Additionally, Mongol battlefield communication utilized signal flags and horns and to a lesser extent, signal arrows to communicate movement orders during combat.

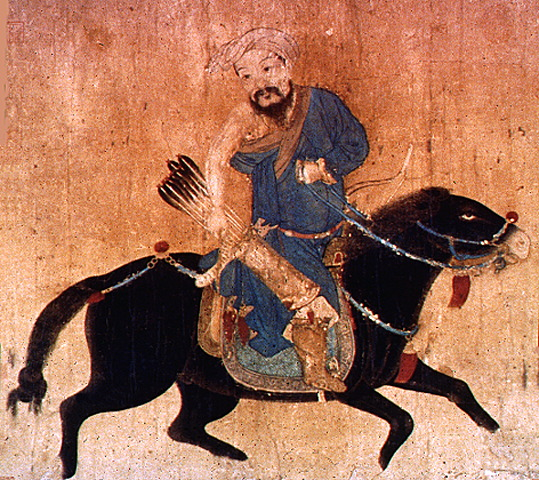
Drawing of a mobile Mongol soldier with bow and arrow wearing deel. The right arm is semi-naked because of the hot weather.

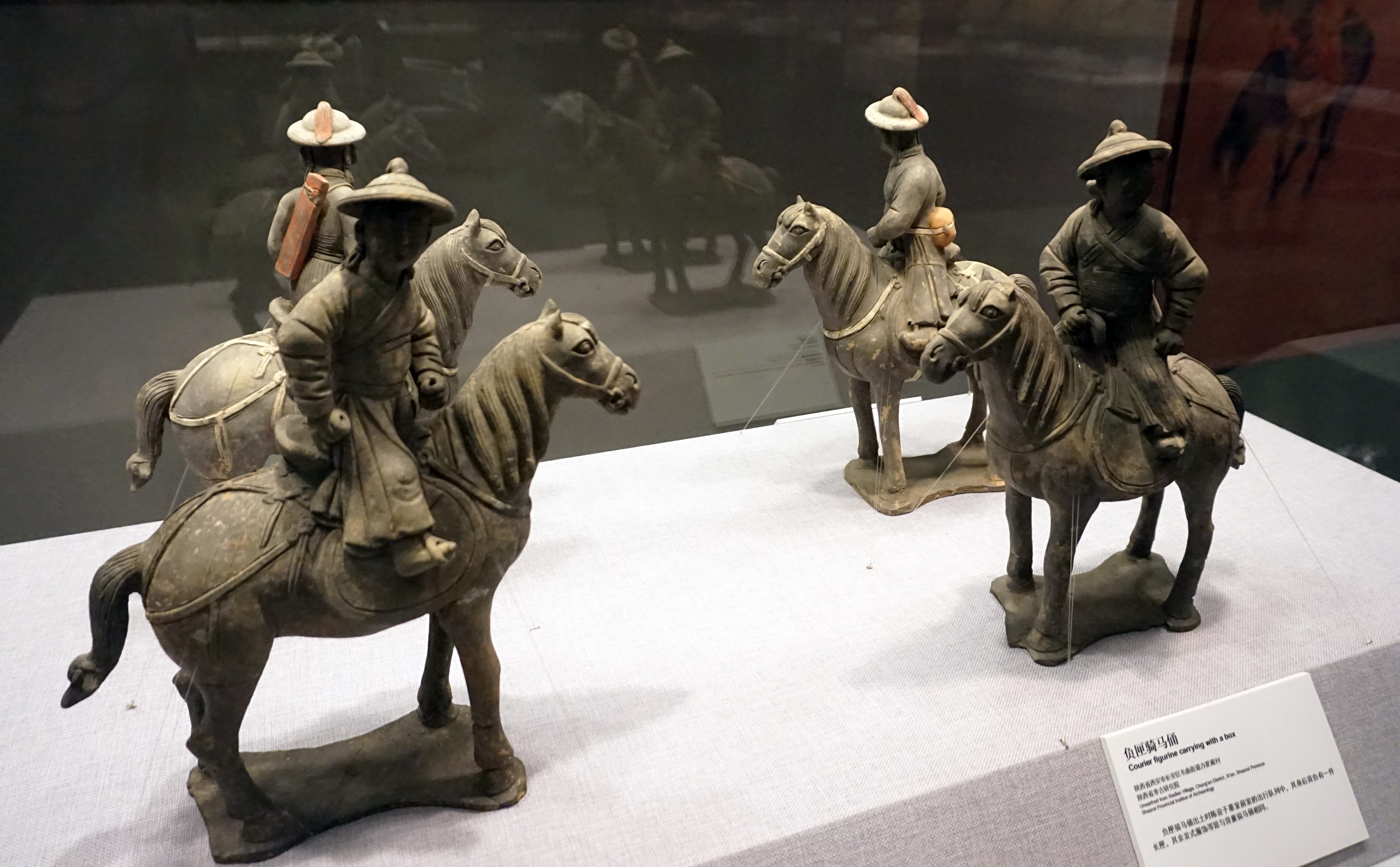
Yuan dynasty cavalry figurines

== See also ==
- Mongol invasions and conquests
  - Horses in East Asian warfare
  - Ritual warfare
- Eight Banners
- Military of the Yuan dynasty

== Bibliography ==
- Amitai-Preiss, Reuven. The Mamluk-Ilkhanid War, 1998
- Andrade, Tonio (2016), The Gunpowder Age: China, Military Innovation, and the Rise of the West in World History, Princeton University Press, ISBN 978-0-691-13597-7.
- Arnold, Thomas (2001), The Renaissance at War, Cassell & Co, ISBN 978-0-304-35270-8
- Chambers, James, The Devil's Horsemen: The Mongol Invasion of Europe. Book Sales Press, 2003.
- R.E. Dupuy and T.N. Dupuy -- The Encyclopedia Of Military History: From 3500 B.C. To The Present. (2nd Revised Edition 1986)
- Hildinger, Erik -- Warriors of the Steppe: A Military History of Central Asia, 500 B.C. to A.D. 1700. Da Capo Press, 2001.
- Morgan, David -- The Mongols. Wiley-Blackwell, ISBN 0-631-17563-6
- Jones Archer -- Art of War in the Western World [1]
- Liang, Jieming (2006), Chinese Siege Warfare: Mechanical Artillery & Siege Weapons of Antiquity, Singapore, Republic of Singapore: Leong Kit Meng, ISBN 978-981-05-5380-7
- Lu, Gwei-Djen (1988), "The Oldest Representation of a Bombard", Technology and Culture, 29 (3): 594–605, doi:10.2307/3105275, JSTOR 3105275, S2CID 112733319
- May, Timothy (2001). "Mongol Arms". Explorations in Empire: Pre-Modern Imperialism Tutorial: The Mongols. San Antonio College History Department. Archived from the original on 18 May 2008.
- May, Timothy "The Mongol Art of War." Westholme Publishing - The Mongol Art of War Westholme Publishing, Yardley. 2007.
- Needham, Joseph (1971), Science and Civilization in China Volume 4 Part 3, Cambridge At The University Press
- Needham, Joseph (1980), Science & Civilisation in China, vol. 5 pt. 4, Cambridge University Press, ISBN 978-0-521-08573-1
- Needham, Joseph (1986), Science & Civilisation in China, vol. V:7: The Gunpowder Epic, Cambridge University Press, ISBN 978-0-521-30358-3.
- Nicolle, David -- The Mongol Warlords Brockhampton Press, 1998
- Nicolle, David (2003), Medieval Siege Weapons (2): Byzantium, the Islamic World & India AD 476–1526, Osprey Publishing
- Charles Oman -- The History of the Art of War in the Middle Ages (1898, rev. ed. 1953)
- Partington, J. R. (1960), A History of Greek Fire and Gunpowder, Cambridge, UK: W. Heffer & Sons.
- Partington, J. R. (1999), A History of Greek Fire and Gunpowder, Baltimore: Johns Hopkins University Press, ISBN 978-0-8018-5954-0
- Patrick, John Merton (1961), Artillery and warfare during the thirteenth and fourteenth centuries, vol. 8, Issue 3 of Monograph series, Utah State University Press, ISBN 9780874210262
- Purton, Peter (2010), A History of the Late Medieval Siege, 1200–1500, Boydell Press, ISBN 978-1-84383-449-6
- Saunders, J.J. -- The History of the Mongol Conquests, Routledge & Kegan Paul Ltd, 1971, ISBN 0-8122-1766-7
- Sicker, Martin -- The Islamic World in Ascendancy: From the Arab Conquests to the Siege of Vienna, Praeger Publishers, 2000
- Soucek, Svatopluk -- A History of Inner Asia, Cambridge, 2000
- Verbruggen, J.F. -- The Art of Warfare in Western Europe during the Middle Ages, Boydell Press, Second English translation 1997, ISBN 0-85115-570-7
- Iggulden, Conn -- Genghis, Birth of an Empire, Bantham Dell.
