= Mongol invasion of East Asia =

Mongol invasion of East Asia may refer to:

- Mongol conquests of East Asia, general information about Mongol conquests
- Mongol invasion of Central Asia, from 1206 to 1221, Genghis Khan's armies expanded the Mongol Empire after the unification of the Mongol/Turkic tribes. This period was considered to end with the conquering of the Khwarizmian Empire.
- Mongol invasion of China, lasting six decades, culminated with the fall of the Chinese Song dynasty in 1279
- Mongol invasions of Korea, a series of campaigns by the Mongol Empire against Korea, then known as Goryeo, from 1231 to 1270
- Mongol invasions of Japan, unsuccessful attempts by Kublai Khan in 1274 and 1281 to invade Japan
- Mongol invasions of Vietnam, three major campaigns between 1257 and 1288
