= Siege of Nishapur (1221) =

1221 siege during the Mongol invasion of the Khwarazmian Empire

- Part of the Mongol invasion of Khorasan
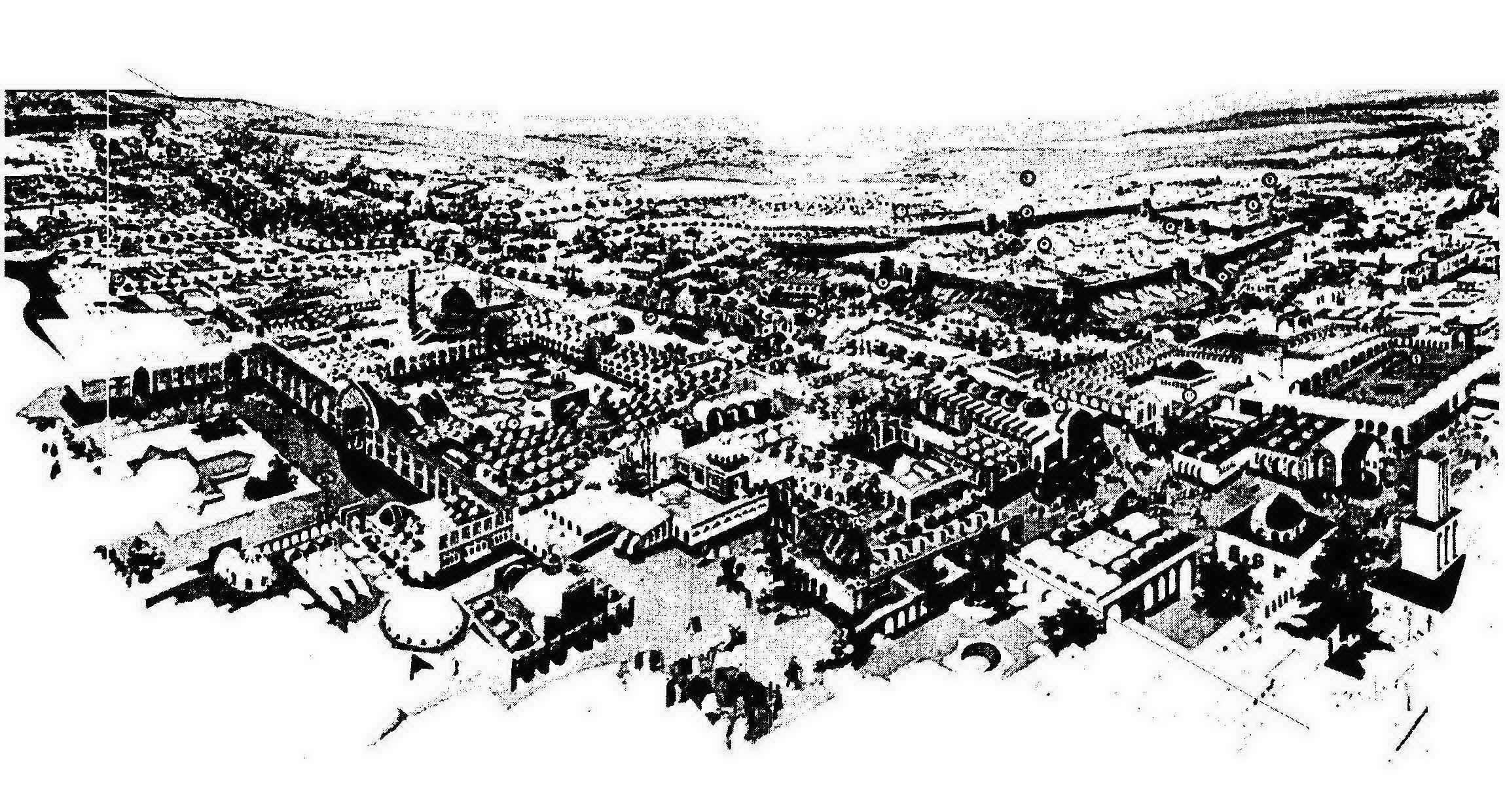
- Modern reconstruction of medieval Nishapur, based on the 1936 edition of History of Nishapur by Al-Hakim al-Nishapuri (10th century chronicler).
| Date | April 1221 CE (Muharram 618 AH) |
| Location | Nishapur, Khwarazmian Empire (present-day Razavi Khorasan province, Iran) 36°12′48″N 58°47′45″E |
| Result | Mongol victory |
| Territorial changes | Nishapur and surrounding regions destroyed |

Belligerents
| Mongol Empire | Khwarazmian Empire |

Commanders and leaders
| Genghis Khan; Tolui; Taghachar † | Sharaf al-Dīn Amīr Majlis (governor) † |

Units involved
| Horse archers, Siege engines, including Chinese gunpowder weapons | City garrison |

Strength
| 10,000-15,000 soldiers | Entire force including 48,000 archers |

Casualties and losses
| Unknown | Heavy |
- Estimated up to 1,747,000 civilians killed
- Location of the siege on a map of modern Iran Nishapur (West and Central Asia)

The siege of Nishapur (Persian:محاصره نیشاپور) took place in April 1221 (Muharram 618 AH), during the Mongol invasion of Khorasan. The siege was led by Tolui Khan, son of Genghis Khan, following the death of Genghis Khan's son-in-law Taghaqchar during an earlier engagement at Nishapur. The fall of the city resulted in a large-scale massacre and the near-total destruction of Nishapur.

The city of Nishapur was a major center of learning, trade, and culture in Khorasan. Located on the Silk Road, it thrived as a regional capital known for its bustling markets, pottery, and production of textiles and turquoise. Then it became part of the Khwarazmian Empire. In the spring of 1221 a Mongol force, estimated to number between 10,000 and 15,000 men and led by Tolui, son of Genghis Khan, besieged the city and after breaching its defences, the entire population was put to the sword and the city laid waste as an act of vengeance. According to the Persian chronicler Ata-Malik Juvayni, the settlement was so thoroughly destroyed that not even cats and dogs were spared, and its site was sown with barley.

Historical accounts state that Nishapurs population was massacred following its capture by the Mongols in 1221. Medieval sources, including Ata-Malik Juvayni, report death tolls exceeding 1,747,000 people, while some modern scholars call these exaggerations and estimate casualties between 100,000 and 200,000.

== Background ==
Nishapur (Note: Also called Nisapur, Nishapûr, Nišāpur, Nichapur, Nichabur, Nishabur or Neyshâbûr.) was located on a plain surrounded by mountains and had both surface and underground channels (qanat) that supplied water to the city and nearby farms. It had a citadel (kuhandiz or qohandez), an intramural city (shahristán or šahrestān), and extramural suburbs (rabad or rabaz), in addition to an Aljama mosque, a government palace, and markets. The citadel stood on an artificial platform, constructed by the Samanids, a dynasty that carried out similar works in Bukhara and Samarkand.

Nishapur was a major Iranian city located in Khorasan and was a major crossroads on the Silk Road. It served as the capital of several dynasties throughout its history and became one of eastern Iran’s principal urban centres. Under the Samanids, Nishapur became a provincial capital and hub of trade and culture. During the Seljuk period, the city rose to even greater prominence, often serving as a royal residence. In its prosperous eras, the city was noted for vibrant trade (silk, cotton textiles, turquoise), skilled artisans, and intellectual activity. During the 11th to 13th centuries, shortly before the Mongol conquest, Nishapur was one of the largest and most prosperous cities in the region, with a population estimated between 100,000 and 200,000.

=== Prelude ===
Campaigns of Genghis Khan between 1207 and 1225

Swedish scholar Carl Fredrick Sverdrup interprets that the Mongol generals Jebe, Subutai and Taghachar were sent to pursue the fleeing Shah Mohammed II of Khwarazm in 1220, but after crossing the Amu Daria, Taghaqchar stayed behind in Balkh. In May 1220 Jebe and Subutai arrived in Nishapur demanding provisions, which were delivered quickly, before they continued towards Tus to pursue the Shah. They left Nishapur on June, but in the following months, false rumors of Mongolian defeats led their city's inhabitants to rebel. The khagan then sent Taghaqchar to pacify Khorasan. He attacked enemy positions near Herat. This attack may have been a breach of the agreement between Nishapur’s inhabitants and Jebe and Subutai, although Taghaqchar did not attack the city directly.

Following the fall of Urgench in early 1221, Genghis Khan split his forces to subdue the regions actively rebelling against the Mongols throughout Persia and Central Asia. hearing about the successes of the Khwarazmian prince Jalal al-Din Mangburni, Genghis Khan instructed his fourth son, Tolui, to lead an army of 80,000 men to Khorasan, with the mission of destroying the remaining Khwarazmian strongholds, including Merv, Nishapur, and Herat. Nishapur's governor, Sharaf al-Din Amir Majlis, resolved to resist the Mongol advance, supported by local militias and a force of 12,000 archers stationed at each of the four city gates, totaling 48,000.

== Siege ==
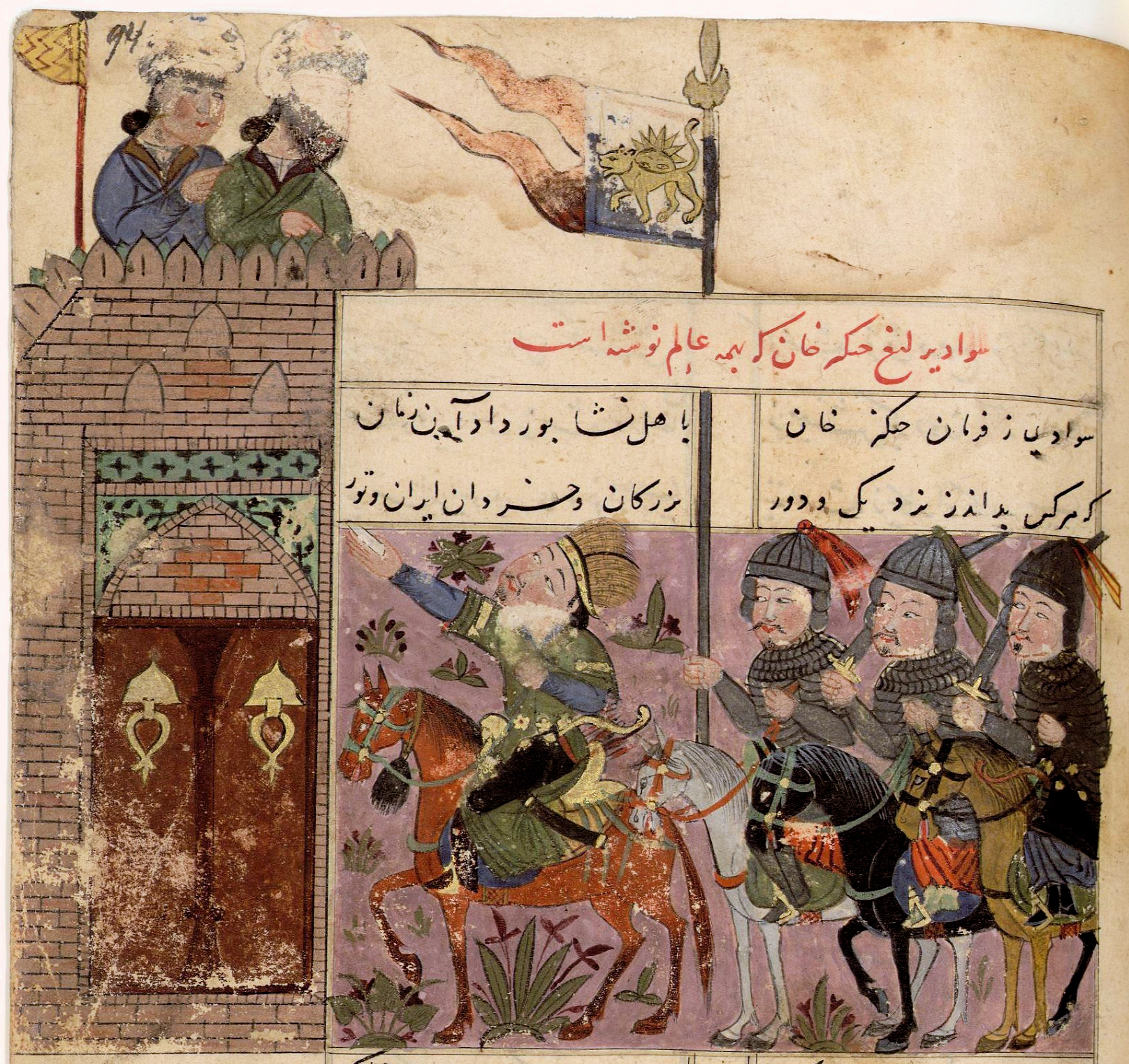
Envoys of Genghis Khan at the gates of Nishapur. Chingizid Shâhnâma by Shams al-Dîn Kâshânî, 1423

Tolui's army reached Nishapur in Ṣafar 618 AH (March–April 1221 CE). The Mongols surrounded the city and began bombardment using a large arsenal that, according to Persian chroniclers, included 3,000 siege crossbows, 100 mangonels and ballistae, 1,000 scaffolds, 4,000 scaling ladders, and 1,700 naphtha-throwers. Although the accuracy of these figures is uncertain, they illustrate the scale and sophistication of the Mongol siege machinery, influenced by Chinese technology.

For eight days, the defenders roughly 12,000 archers repelled several attacks. They saw no hope of salvation except in sending the city’s chief qadi, Mawlānā Rukn al-Dīn ʿAlī ibn Ibrāhīm al-Mughīsī (al-Marghīsī), to Tolui. Upon reaching him, he pleaded for quarter on behalf of the people of Nishapur and agreed to pay tribute in an attempt to secure their safety. His efforts however were unsuccessful, and he himself was not permitted to return. The Mongols launched a concentrated attack the next day, breaking through the walls in over 70 locations. Assault troops climbed the battlements using ladders, and Tolui’s forces poured into the city, engaging in brutal street fighting. The collapse of organized resistance was caused by the combat death of Governor Sharaf al-Din. Taghachars wife allegedly led 10,000 cavalry to punish Nishapur following her husband’s death. The story may be a narrative motif, and the city’s inhabitants are described as having suffered extremely, “quaffing from the goblet of martyrdom.” It is estimated that potentially up to 1,747,000 people were slaughtered. Historical accounts describe the Mongol forces as having stacked the severed heads of men, women, and children separately into three large pyramids as a calculated act meant to instill terror and intimidation.

=== Notable casualties ===
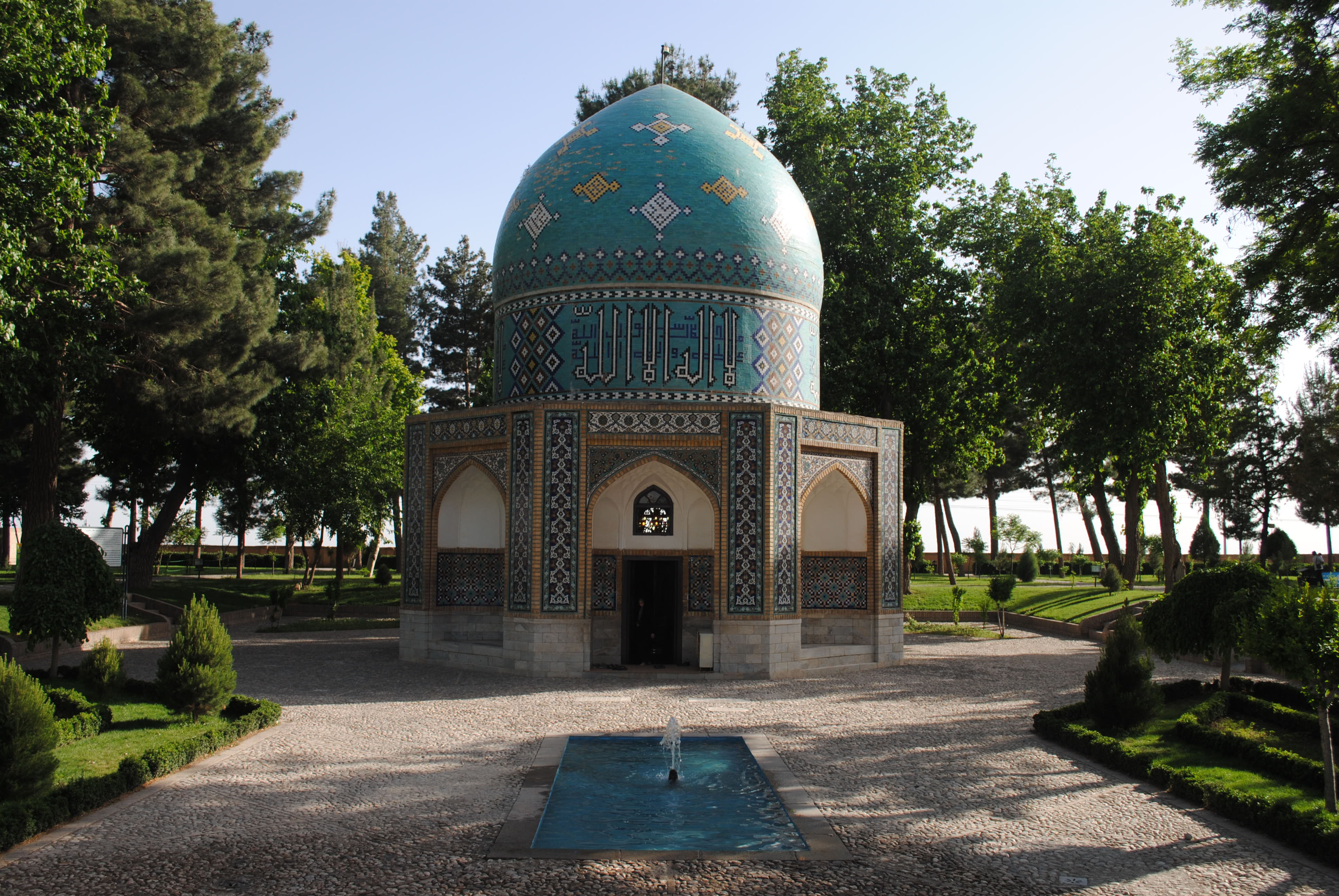
Mausoleum of Attar of Nishapur in Nishapur

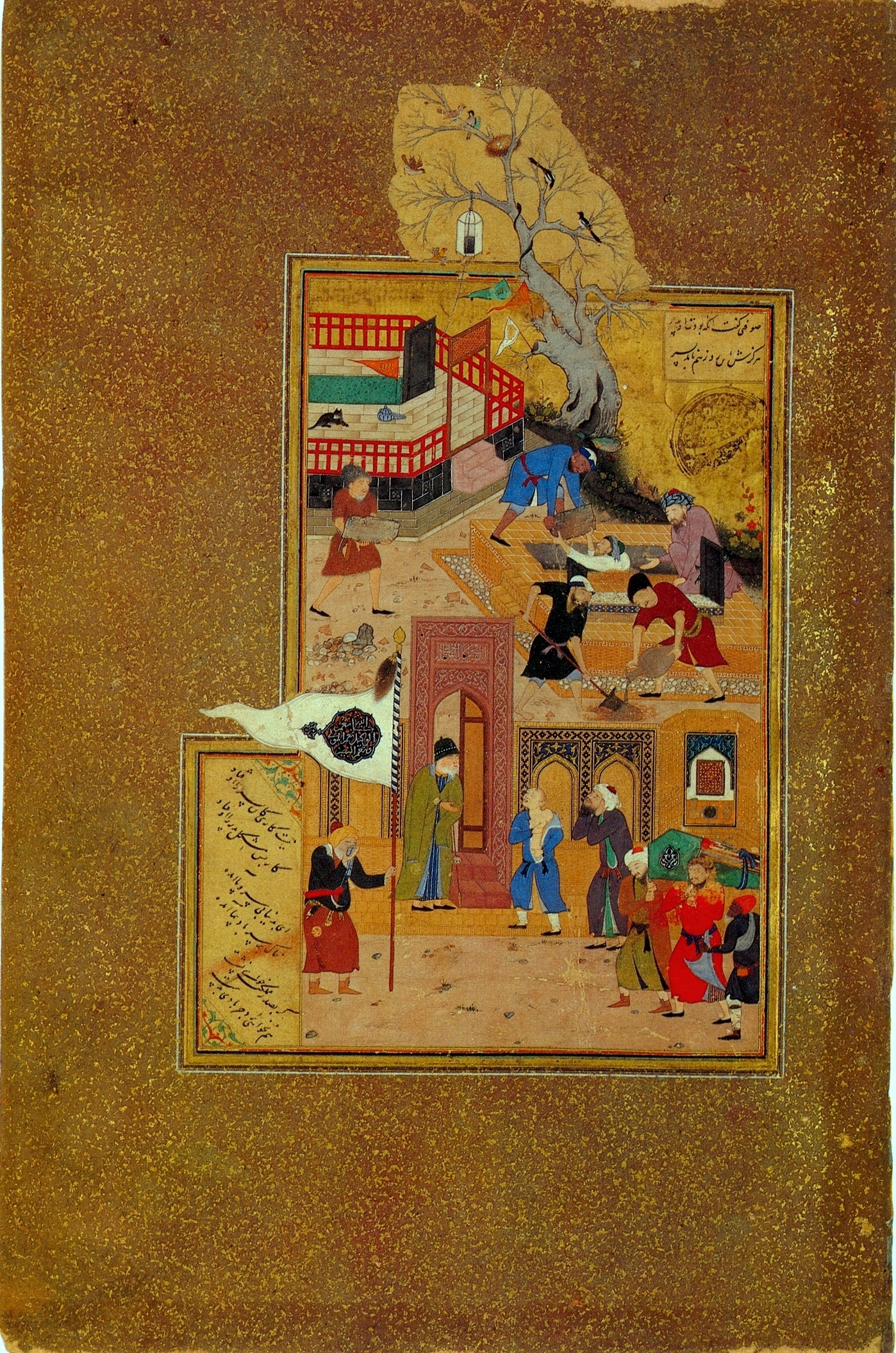
Miniature painting by Kamāl ud-Dīn Behzād illustrating the funeral of Attar of Nishapur

The distinguished Persian poet, Sufi mystic, and hagiographer Attar of Nishapur was one of those slain during the Mongol massacre. Attar, who is regarded as one of the most important figures in classical Persian literature, was allegedly killed by a Mongol soldier when the city was being sacked when he was about seventy-eight years old. Both Persian chronicles and contemporary scholarship have cited his death during the fall of Nishapur as a major cultural loss, signifying the annihilation of the city's literary and intellectual legacy in addition to its populace.

== Aftermath ==
After the fall of Nishapur in 1221 by the Mongols, the structures of the city were weakened and the agricultural output of the city was reduced. Following the capture of the city, Tolui decided to advance toward Herat, but before departing, he appointed an emir with a detachment of four hundred Taziks, ordering them to scour the ruins of Nishapur and execute any inhabitants who had survived the initial massacre, thereby ensuring that no resistance or population would remain. Mahmud Ghazan and Abu Sa'id Bahadur Khan tried to make the city flourish again and the city's population grew once more and some of the villages around the city were improved and rebuilt. Hamdallah Mustawfi had visited the city of Nishapur in the Year 1339 or 1340. During this era, the ambassador of Henry III of Castile, Ruy González de Clavijo reached Nishapur and according to him, Nishapur had become a highly productive agricultural center with 40 non-stop working mills along the "Abe Bostan" (Mir Ab River of Nishapur).

After the massacre, a much smaller settlement was established just north of the ancient town, and the once bustling metropolis lay underground—until a team of excavators from the Metropolitan Museum of Art arrived in the mid-20th century. They worked at Nishapur between 1935 and 1940, returning for a final season in the winter of 1947–48. What remains of old Nishapur is a 3500-hectare "Kohandejh (Persian: کهن دژ)" area, south of the current city of Nishapur.
