= Chem River Battle =

13th-century battle involving the Mongol Empire

Battle of the Chem
- Part of Mongol campaigns in Central Asia
Date	Early 13th century
Location	Emba (Chem) River, Kazakhstan
Result	Mongol victory

Belligerents
Mongol Empire; Kingdom of Qocho	Merkits; Qangli Kipchaks; Ölberli Kipchaks

Commanders and leaders
Jochi; Subutai; Toquchar; Jebe (possibly); Barchuq Art Tegin	Qudu (possibly (executed) ) Chila'un; Majar; Tiiseken; Inassu; Qal-toqan

Strength
Total unknown, over 2,000	Unknown

The Chem River Battle, also known as the Battle on the Djem or Chem River campaign, was an early 13th century battle between the Mongol Empire and remnants of the Merkits allied with the Qangli and Ölberli Kipchaks, fought at the Emba (Chem or Djem) River, in what is now western Kazakhstan. The Merkit–Kipchak alliance was defeated and the remnants of that force fled north.

== Background ==
The Merkit had a long-standing feud with the Borjigin clan to which Temujin, the future Genghis Khan, belonged. They and the Naimans opposed the rise of Genghis Khan. They joined with the forces of Jamukha and Toghrul to oppose Temujin in the Battle of Chakirmaut in 1204. Temujin defeated the alliance, and the surviving Merkit and Naimans fled into Western Siberia, where they eventually gathered at the Irtysh. Temujin's victory against the alliance consolidated his control of the Mongol and Turkic tribes in the region. In 1206, he was elected the khan of the new Mongol Empire and given the name Genghis Khan. In either late 1208 or early 1209, as part of the conquest of Siberia, a Mongol expedition commanded by Genghis Khan's oldest son, Jochi, met the Merkits and Naimans at a branch of the Irtysh. The Merkit commander Toqto'a was killed in action, and many of his soldiers drowned in the river attempting to flee.

After their defeat at the Irtysh, many of the surviving Merkit fled to the Uyghur kingdom of Qocho. The leader of the Uyghur, Barchuq Art Tegin, however, voluntarily submitted to the Mongol Empire, and executed the Merkit envoy, Ebügen. The Merkit then moved on west into the Kipchak confederacy, specifically the eastern lands controlled by the Qangli. Within this, the Merkit fled to a region in which the Ölberli were the dominant clan. Inassu, the Ölberli leader, opted to shelter the Merkit. Marie Favereau argues that the Ölberli welcomed the Merkit for their value as an auxiliary military force. Buell notes that in their flight from the Iyrtysh, the Merkit brothers demonstrated great tactical skill.

== Prelude ==
To deal with the persistent Merkit threat, Genghis dispatched the generals Subutai and Tuqachar, under the overarching command of Genghis's oldest son, Jochi. Christopher Atwood notes that this was the first campaign since the unification of Genghis Khan's empire to cross westward across Kazakhstan. Atwood also contends that, contrary to the standard historical narrative regarding Jochi as found in the Secret History of the Mongols, the Veritable Record of Chinggis Khan, and Juvayni's History of the World Conqueror (all of which were drafted later, during reigns of Möngke and Kublai Khan), Jochi was the supreme commander of the expedition, not Subutai. Jebe is also mentioned in many sources as a commander in the expedition. However, Atwood argues that Jebe was not involved with the pursuit of the Merkit across Kazakhstan at all, but rather at this time was pursuing Kuchlug in Badakshan in Afghanistan after conquering the Qara Khitai. Timothy May rests the question of whether it was Jebe or Jochi accompanying Subutai on the date of the campaign, of which May is uncertain but assigns 1209 as the most likely year. Paul Buell, who also dates the subsequent battle to 1209, argues that after Jebe pursued Kuchlug into the lands of the Qara Khitai he linked up his army with that of Subutai to strike at the Merkit.

Jointly, the Uyghur sent a contingent to confront the Merkit. Some accounts mention solely the Uyghur contingent. Buell in a 1992 article considers this highly unlikely given the political-military situation of the Uyghur and their geographical distance from the battle; Atwood likewise deems the assertion of a solely Uyghur expedition "geographically incoherent and historically dubious". Conversely, in a 1993 article, Buell states that the Uyghur attacked the Merkit at the Chem and were "possibly" reinforced by Subutai. In 2003, Buell yet again described the expedition as jointly Uyghur and Mongol. Atwood thinks that the Uyghur participation in the campaign was a small "probationary" vanguard by Qocho to prove their loyalty. As Subutai approached the Qangli, he sought to avoid conflict by sending the Qangli an ultimatum to hand over the Merkit. The Qangli refused, forcing the Mongol and Uyghur armies to do battle.

== Location ==
The Mongol and Uyghur forces met the Merkit and their Kipchak allies at the Emba River (also known as the Zhem), located in what is now western Kazakhstan on the border between Asia and Europe. The river is referred to variously by historical sources and scholars as the Djem, Chem, and Čem.

The Secret History of the Mongols erroneously identifies the river as the Chu (the Čui). Carl Sverdrup, relying on Vasily Bartold, conflates these two rivers (labeling them variously as the Djem, Cui, Cem, Cham, or Techem) and places the battle as likely near the Uyghur city of Jambaliq (Chambaliq). Buell considers this confrontation at the Chu to be a later, final battle against the Merkit and Qangli. May also views the Chu battle as separate from the Chem but places it first - after the Iyrtysh catastrophe, the Merkit were pursued to the Jam River and defeated again by either a Mongol or Mongol-Uyghur force; after this, the Merkit were again defeated at the Chu, and then fled to the Chem.

Atwood argues that the discrepancy arising from Secret History was an intentional and radical re-write of the narrative by Möngke's administration after a purge of the Uyghur state of Qocho to imply an earlier, independent campaign in 1209 by that state as opposed to a joint Mongol-Uyghur effort. This becomes evident from the account reduplicating its narrative of the Uyghurs confronting the Merkits at the Chem when it recounts the submission of the Uyghur state. Given the unlikeliness of an independent Qocho (located in what is now Xinjiang) campaigning in western Kazakhstan, Atwood argues that the Secret History relocated the conflict to the much closer Chu River. Bolstering this claim, according to Atwood, was the similar toponym of the Uyghur city Chambaliq, and possible existence of a "Cham River" (which Atwood associates with the Santun River in Xinjiang), creating a Chem-Cham name association. Atwood speculates that the rewrite moved the Uyghur participation in the Chem campaign into its narrative about the submission of the Uyghur king to amplify that king's loyalty and write out the "distasteful" idea that the Uyghur might initially have been on a "probationary" period within the Mongol Empire.

== Chronology and date ==
The date of the battle and its chronological location in the western campaigns is debated, being fought some point between 1209 and 1219. May notes that the dates of battles in the campaign to eradicate the Merkits are confusing because the sources conflate events hundreds of miles and many years apart. He settles on 1209 as the most likely date. Buell likewise notes the confusion in the source material regarding the chronology and details of the expedition against the Merkit. It has been conflated both with the subsequent and final battle against the Merkit, which Buell says took place at the Chu in either the spring or early summer of 1218, and the 1219–1220 invasion of Khwarazmia. Buell elaborates that Secret History of the Mongols mistakenly dates the expedition pursuing the Merkit to 1205–1206, which would locate the expedition prior to the battle at the Irtysh that led to the need for the expedition in the first place. Buell believes that the expedition likely began in the very early spring of 1209, immediately after the Irtysh battle, and the subsequent battle at the Djem in the early spring of 1209. Sverdrup also dates the battle as likely 1209. Conversely, Peter Golden cites an approximate range of 1217–1219 as when the battle occurred. Favereau similarly believes that the most likely dates are 1217 or 1218. Atwood, per his argument that an earlier confrontation in 1209 between Qocho and the Merkits at the Chem was invented by Secret History, assigns the battle to after the year 1217. He also holds that the 1219 date assigned to the battle in biographies of Subutai is too late.

== Battle ==
The Merkit at the Chem were commanded by Toqto'a's surviving sons, Qudu, Chila'un, Majar, Tiiseken, and Qal-toqan. On the Mongol side, Tuqachar commanded the vanguard numbering some 2,000 troops, while Subutai commanded a separate force equipped with carts with iron-shod wheels to handle the rocky terrain. The idiqut of Qocho, Barchuq Art Tegin, commanded the additional, likely small or token, Uyghur vanguard. The Mongol forces converged at the Chem and there defeated the Merkit-Kipchak alliance. Atwood characterizes the fight at the Chem as a sequence of battles. Favereau argues that upon defeating the Merkit, Jochi ordered the execution of Qudu. May similarly argues that Qudu was killed at the battle. Buell contends that Qudu fled further among Kipchack, with Subutai in pursuit.

== Aftermath ==
Between the Chem battles and follow-up operations, the remaining Merkit leadership was killed or captured. The Merkit and Qangli Kipchak allies who survived the Chem confrontation, led by Qal-toqan, and possibly Qudu, fled to what is now northern Kazakhstan. Subutai, and Jebe if present, pursued and defeated them either at a point between the Khemchik and Yenisei or at a location known as the Jade Valley near the Chu. This permanently shattered the Merkit as an independent people. Upon the second victory, the Subutai and Jebe (if present) opted to return home without bothering to subjugate the Qangli at that juncture, as the military-political situation had for the time being been stabilized. The defeat of Inassu meant the end of his tenure as the Ölberli leader.

Buell believes that the Irghiz River skirmish between the Mongols and Khwarazmia occurred in late Autumn or early winter 1209 as a collision of an anti-raiding expedition by Jalal al-Din Mangburni with Subutai's pursuit force against the Merkit after the Djem battle. Atwood concurs with Buell that this confrontation was prior to the large invasion of Khwarazmia but, rather than 1209, assigns a date of 1219.
