= Mongol invasion of Khorasan =

Mongol campaign in 1220–1221

Mongol conquest of Khorasan
- Part of the Mongol invasion of the Khwarazmian Empire
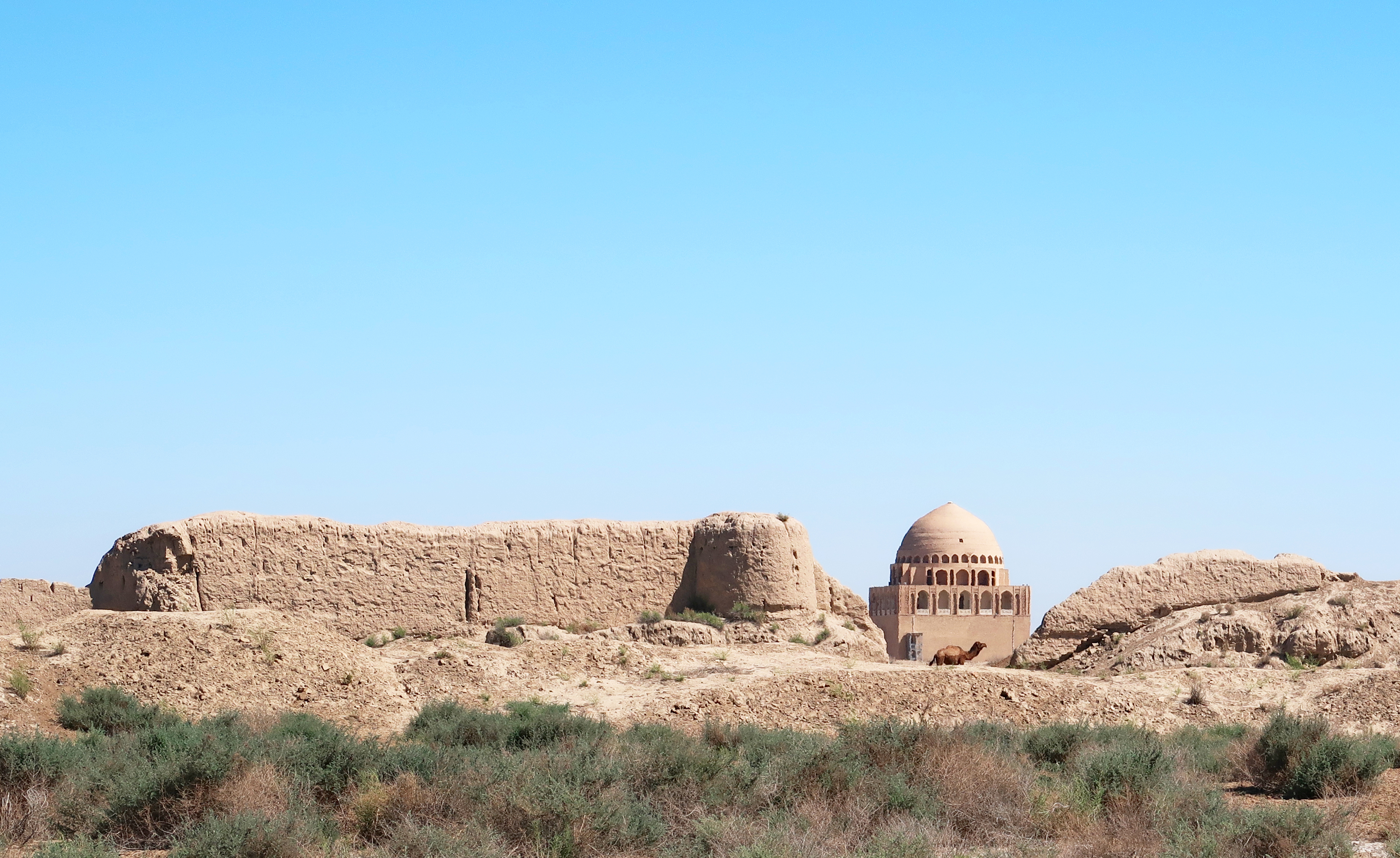
- The walls of the city of Merv, which never recovered from the Mongol conquests; the tomb of Ahmad Sanjar can be seen through a gap in the ruined fortifications.
Date	1220–1221
Location	Khorasan (modern-day Turkmenistan, Iran, and Afghanistan)
Result	Mongol victory
Territorial changes	Mongol occupation of Khorasan

Belligerents
Mongol Empire	Khwarazmian Empire

Casualties and losses
Light	Devastating
- Massacres reported in major cities such as Nishapur, Herat, Merv, and Balkh.

The Mongol invasion of Khorasan took place in 1220–1221, during the Mongol conquest of the Khwarazmian Empire. As the Khwarazmian Empire disintegrated after the capture of the large cities of Samarkand and Bukhara by the Mongol Empire, Shah Muhammad II fled westwards in the hope of gathering an army. Genghis Khan ordered two of his foremost generals, Subutai and Jebe, to follow the Shah and prevent any such Khwarazmian resurgence; meanwhile, he sent his youngest son Tolui south to subjugate any resistance.

The region Khorasan contained Silk Road cities such as Merv, Nishapur, and Herat, which were among the largest and richest in the world. Tolui systematically besieged and captured them in turn, pillaging their wealth and executing their inhabitants. Although modern historians regard the figures of medieval chroniclers to be vastly exaggerated—one account has 2.4 million people killed in Nishapur alone—the figures reflect a social catastrophe so extreme the local populations found it difficult to quantify their loss.

== Campaign ==
=== Background ===
During the invasion of the Khwarazmian Empire, which began in 1219, Tolui initially accompanied his father's army. They bypassed the ongoing siege at Otrar to attack the major centres of Transoxiana—the Khwarazmshah's capital Samarkand and its neighbour Bukhara—in early 1220. The latter was captured in February after a swift siege, while Samarkand fell a couple of months later. Genghis moved southwards into the Turkestan mountain range, where he rested his army for the summer while his generals Jebe and Subutai moved westwards and his sons conducted various operations; he emerged in the autumn to assault and capture Termez.

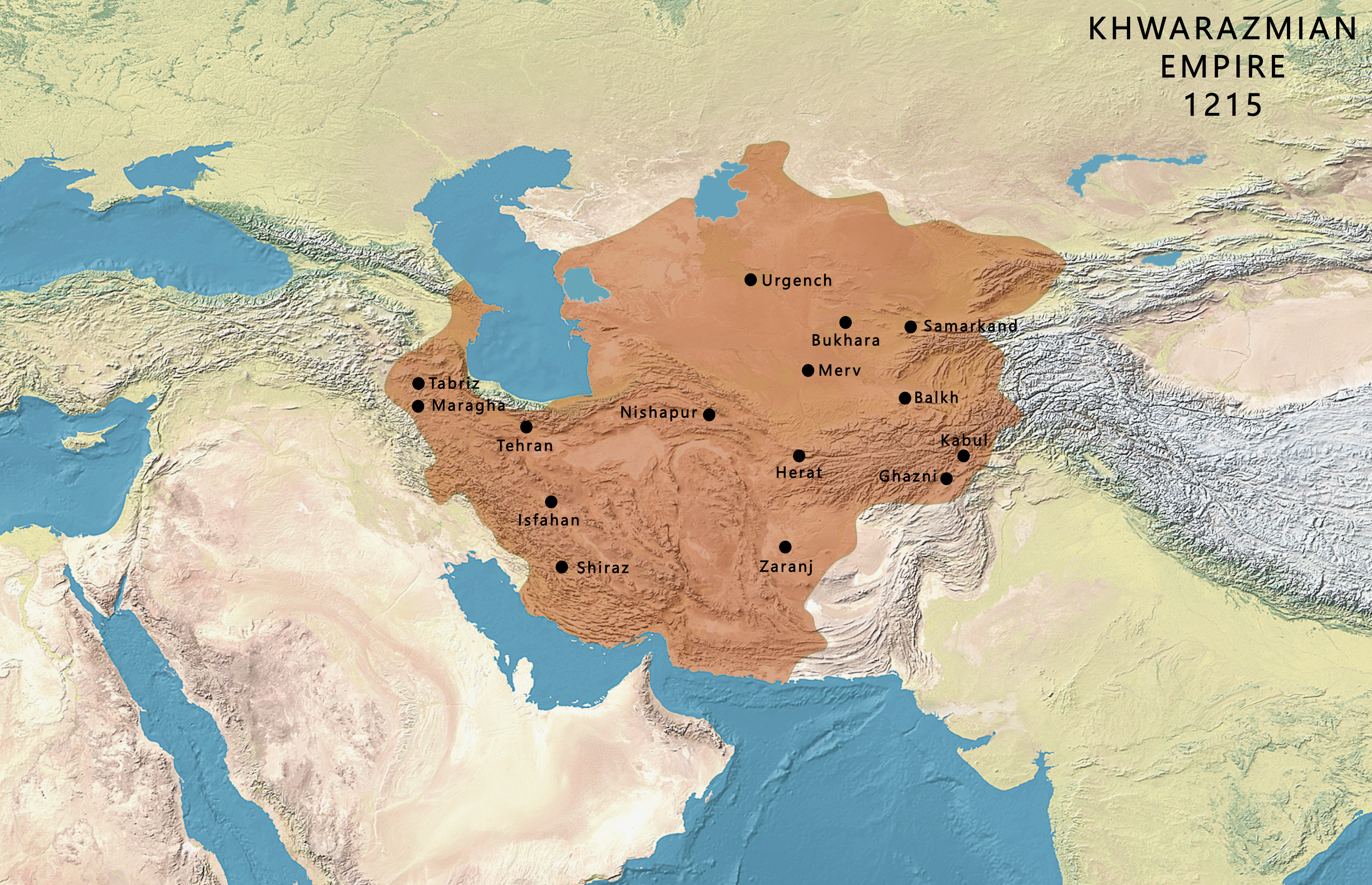
A map of the Khwarazmian Empire in 1215; Tolui's campaign subjugated Khorasan, the central region of the empire.

Tolui and his father spent the winter of 1220–1221 dealing with rebels on the upper Vakhsh river in modern-day Tajikistan. By this point, Jebe and Subutai had moved into western Iran to pursue Shah Muhammad II, and the cities which had earlier submitted to them in the Khorasan region had become bolder; Genghis Khan's son-in-law Toquchar was killed by a nascent rebellion at Nishapur in November 1220. After capturing a city in early 1221 and while continuing to besiege Taliqan, Genghis dispatched Tolui to Khorasan to make sure that no opposition remained in the extensive and wealthy region. His task was to pacify and subjugate the region and its cities by any means possible, and he carried out the task "with a thoroughness from which that region has never recovered", in the words of the historian J.A. Boyle.

=== Merv, Nishapur, and Herat ===
Tolui's army was composed of a tenth of the Mongol invasion force augmented by Khwarazmian conscripts; the historian Carl Sverdrup estimates its size at around 7,000 men. He marched westwards from Balkh to Murichaq, on the present-day Afghanistan–Turkmenistan border, and then crossed the Marghab river and its tributary the Kushk to approach the city of Merv from the south. He ambushed a force of Turkmen raiders during the night of 24 February; the surprise attack caught the raiders off guard, and those who were not killed by the Mongols or did not drown in the river were scattered. The Mongols arrived at Merv the following day.

After assessing the city for six days, Tolui came to the conclusion that the city fortifications would withstand a lengthy siege. Having been subjected to a general assault on the seventh day, the townspeople, who twice attempted a sortie to no effect, lost the will to resist and surrendered to the Mongols, who promised to treat them fairly. Tolui, however, reneged on this guarantee, and ordered that the entire population be driven out on the plain and put to the sword, excluding a small number of artisans and children. It was reported that each Mongol soldier was allotted between three and four hundred people to kill; the contemporary chronicler Ibn al-Athir estimated the number of deaths at 700,000, while the chronicler Ata-Malik Juvayni, writing a few decades later, recorded that a cleric spent thirteen days counting the dead and arrived at a figure of 1,300,000.

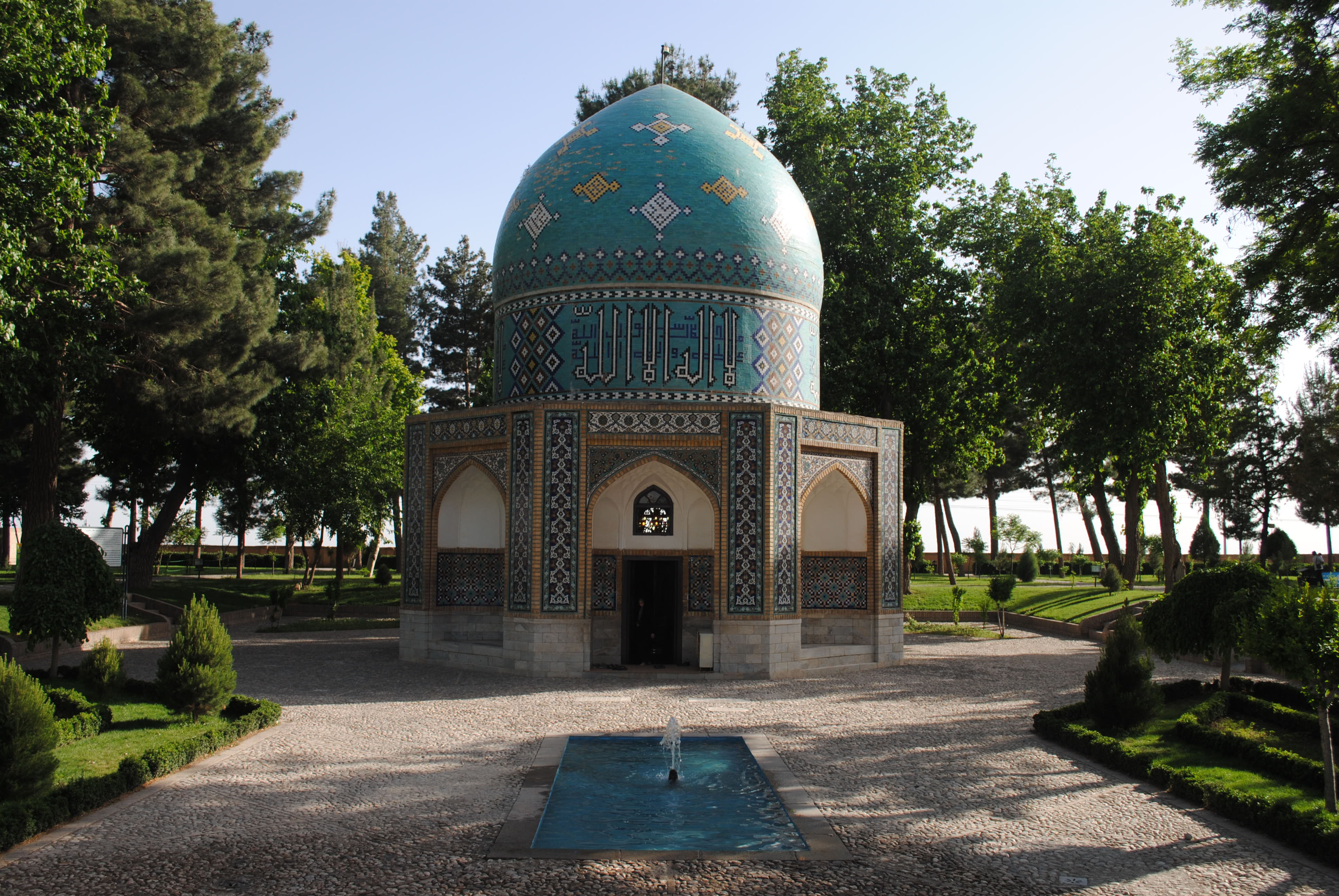
The mausoleum of Attar of Nishapur, a Persian poet who was killed during the sack of Nishapur, was built during the Timurid Renaissance in the 15th century.

Tolui had meanwhile marched on south-westerly towards Nishapur, which had already seen a number of events during the war. Muhammad II, the ruler of the Khwarazmian Empire, had arrived nearly a year earlier on 18 April 1220, fleeing the Mongol advance in Transoxiana. He departed in mid-May that year, just in time to escape the armies of Jebe and Subutai, who arrived the following day. The city submitted to the generals, who requested them to reduce their walls and aid any Mongols who passed by. However, the city did not heed these instructions and instead began causing trouble for the Mongols, killing Toquchar when he attempted to enforce control. Jalal al-Din, the eldest son and heir of the now-deceased Muhammad II, arrived at the city on 10 February 1221, attempting to escape the ongoing Mongol siege at Gurganj, the capital of the empire; he remained at the city for only a couple of days before departing in the direction of Zozan.

Tolui arrived at the city on 7 April, and the inhabitants, awed by the size of his force, immediately sought to agree surrender terms. Because the killing of the khan's son-in-law had been a grave insult to the Mongols, all proposals were rejected; the assault had begun before the end of the day, with the walls being breached on 9 April and the city captured the next day. According to Juvayni, the city was razed in revenge; Toquchar's widow supervised the massacre of the entire population of the city, with the exception of 400 craftsmen. Unlike in Merv, all children were killed, and the corpses of the alleged 1,747,000 victims, including all the cats and dogs in the city, were piled in great heaps. The ground was subsequently ploughed over. While marching through the region, Tolui was also sending detachments against surrounding towns such as Abiward, Nasa, Tus, and Jajarm.

There has been some confusion about the fate of Herat, the last of the great cities of Khorasan. The early 20th-century historian Vasily Bartold, citing a local history from the 1400s, stated that none of the inhabitants were killed with the exception of the garrison; meanwhile, the chronicler Minhaj-i Siraj Juzjani, who fought the Mongols nearby, recorded that after an eight-month siege, the city was taken and its population slaughtered. It is now known, thanks to a chronicle rediscovered in 1944, that there were two sieges of Herat. The first started with the execution of a Mongol diplomat in the town; an incensed Tolui launched an eight-day assault, which culminated in the death of the town's malik (governor). From the edge of the city moat, Tolui proclaimed that the inhabitants would be spared if they surrendered. Unlike at Merv, the Mongols honoured their word, only killing the 12,000 men in the city garrison. Having appointed a Mongol overseer to govern the town, Tolui left the region to rejoin his father at Taliqan in mid-1221. The population subsequently rebelled and were besieged for months by the Mongol general Eljigidei, who was said to have killed between 1,600,000 and 2,400,000 people during his sack of the town, in a massacre lasting seven days in June 1222.

=== Historiography ===
The death tolls traditionally attributed to Tolui's campaign in Khorasan are considered exaggerated by modern historians. The cities of Merv, Nishapur, and Herat could have only supported fractions of their reported populations, and populations were reported to return almost miraculously to destroyed cities—Genghis Khan's adopted son Shigi Qutuqu was said to have ordered the deaths of a further 100,000 at Merv in November 1221, after yet another rebellion. The figures do however clearly represent a demographic catastrophe so extreme the native populations found it difficult to quantify the destruction. The historian Michal Biran has suggested that the speed with which the Mongols brought the pragmatically brutal warfare of East Asia into the less ruthless Muslim world was a factor in this cultural shock.
