= Taghachar (d. 1221) =

Mongol Empire military commander

Taghachar (Note: His name is sometimes written alongside the titles Noyan, Bahadur, or Güregen. The latter literally translates to 'son-in-law'.) (died 1221), also known as Toqučar or Toquchar, was a Mongol military commander, involved in the Mongol campaigns in Central Asia. A son-in-law of Genghis Khan, he most notably took part in the invasion of the Khwarezmian Empire in 1219.

== Background ==
Chroniclers Juvayni and al-Nasawi, both writing in the 13th century, state that Taghachar had been Genghis Khan's son-in-law. Historian Anne Broadbridge identifies his wife as having been a junior princess, rejecting an earlier hypothesis by John Andrew Boyle that she had been Tümelün, daughter of Genghis Khan's chief empress Börte.

Taghachar's own background is vague in Mongol works, with no contemporary source mentioning the name of his father. The 15th-century Timurid chronicler Yazdi writes that Taghachar belonged to the Barlas tribe and had been the son of Suqu Sechen and the younger brother of Qarachar Noyan, the ancestors of Timur. However, historian İlker Evrim Binbaş suggests that this relationship was invented due to the marital link Taghachar provides for the Timurid dynasty with Genghis Khan. Writing later still, the 19th century historian Shir Muhammad Munis states that Taghachar was the son of the Khongirad chief Dei Sechen, and therefore the brother of the empress Börte. Both Anne Broadbridge and John Andrew Boyle also identify Taghachar as a Khongirad, though Broadbridge specifies that he was of a junior line to Börte.

== Military career ==
During the campaign against the Jin, Taghachar remained in Mongolia with 20,000 soldiers, guarding the western border while the main army was absent. Around 1216, he, alongside Subutai and Genghis Khan's son Jochi, commanded troops which pursued the Merkit tribe in the region of the Irgiz and Turgay rivers. Taghachar led the vanguard in the ensuing battle at Chem River. Though some Merkits survived the subsequent Mongol victory, they never again existed as a people.

Soon after, in Dasht-i Qipchaq, the Mongols were attacked by the army of Muhammad II of Khwarazm; this was the first military encounter between the Mongol and Khwarezmian empires. The resulting battle was indecisive, and the Mongols departed that night, though it made an impression on Muhammad II, and was one of the reasons why he subsequently avoided meeting Mongols in the open field.

In the autumn/winter of 1219/20, Taghachar participated in the siege and capture of Otrar from the Khwarezmians. Muhammad II subsequently fled westward before the Mongol advance. Taghachar, Subutai, and Jebe pursued the ruler after his abandonment of Nishapur. The latter two subsequently continued the pursuit while Taghachar remained in Khurasan. According to the Secret History of the Mongols, Taghachar had disregarded Genghis Khan's orders to not plunder the fertile lands surrounding Herat, which had already submitted to the Mongols, causing the leader of the region, Qan Melik, to renege. Due to this insubordination, Genghis Khan initially resolved to execute Taghachar, though changed his mind and severely rebuked and demoted him instead.

Taghachar was later rehabilitated and was appointed to lead the vanguard against the rebelling city of Nishapur, ahead of the main army under Tolui. He was accompanied by another imperial son-in-law, Barchuq Art Tegin. According to Juvayni and Yazdi, Taghachar was killed during the subsequent siege, having been struck by an arrow loosed from the city walls. Tolui later massacred the city in vengeance. In an unusual act, Tolui allowed his sister, Taghachar's widow, to personally oversee some of the executions. Juvayni writes that she "entered the town with her escort, and they slew all the survivors save only four hundred persons". Alternatively, the Rawzat as-safa states that Taghachar was killed by an arrow at Herat, while Rashid al-Din Hamadani has his death at the hands of mountaineers in Ghur.

No source mentions Taghachar's descendants.

== Sources ==
- Binbaş, İlker Evrim (2016). Intellectual Networks in Timurid Iran: Sharaf al-Dīn 'Alī Yazdī and the Islamicate Republic of Letters. Cambridge University Press. ISBN 978-1-107-05424-0.
- Brack, Yoni (2011), "A Mongol Princess Making hajj: The Biography of El Qutlugh Daughter of Abagha Ilkhan (r. 1265-82)", Journal of the Royal Asiatic Society, Third, 21 (3), Cambridge University Press: 331–359, doi:10.1017/S1356186311000265, JSTOR 23011475
- Bregel, Yuri (1983), "The Qongrat Rulers according to Munis", Asian and African Studies, 16 (3), The Institute of Middle Eastern Studies, University of Haifa
- Bregel, Yuri (2003). An Historical Atlas of Central Asia. BRILL. ISBN 978-90-474-0121-6.
- Broadbridge, Anne F. (2018). Women and the Making of the Mongol Empire. Cambridge University Press. ISBN 978-1-108-42489-9.
- Favereau, Marie (2021). The Horde: How the Mongols Changed the World. Harvard University Press. ISBN 978-0-674-24421-4.
- Juvaini, ʻAla-ad-Din ʻAṭa-Malik (1958). The History of the World-Conqueror. Translated by John Andrew Boyle. Manchester University Press.
- Morgan, David O.; Reid, Anthony (2010). The New Cambridge History of Islam: Volume 3, The Eastern Islamic World, Eleventh to Eighteenth Centuries. Cambridge University Press. ISBN 978-1-316-18436-3.
- Woods, John E. (1990), "Timur's Genealogy", in Martin Bernard Dickson; Michel M. Mazzaoui; Vera Basch Moreen (eds.), Intellectual Studies on Islam: Essays Written in Honor of Martin B. Dickson, University of Utah Press, ISBN 978-0-87480-342-6
