= Siege of Samarkand (1220) =

Seizure and destruction of Samarkand by Genghis Khan's Mongol army

- Part of the Mongol invasion of the Khwarazmian Empire
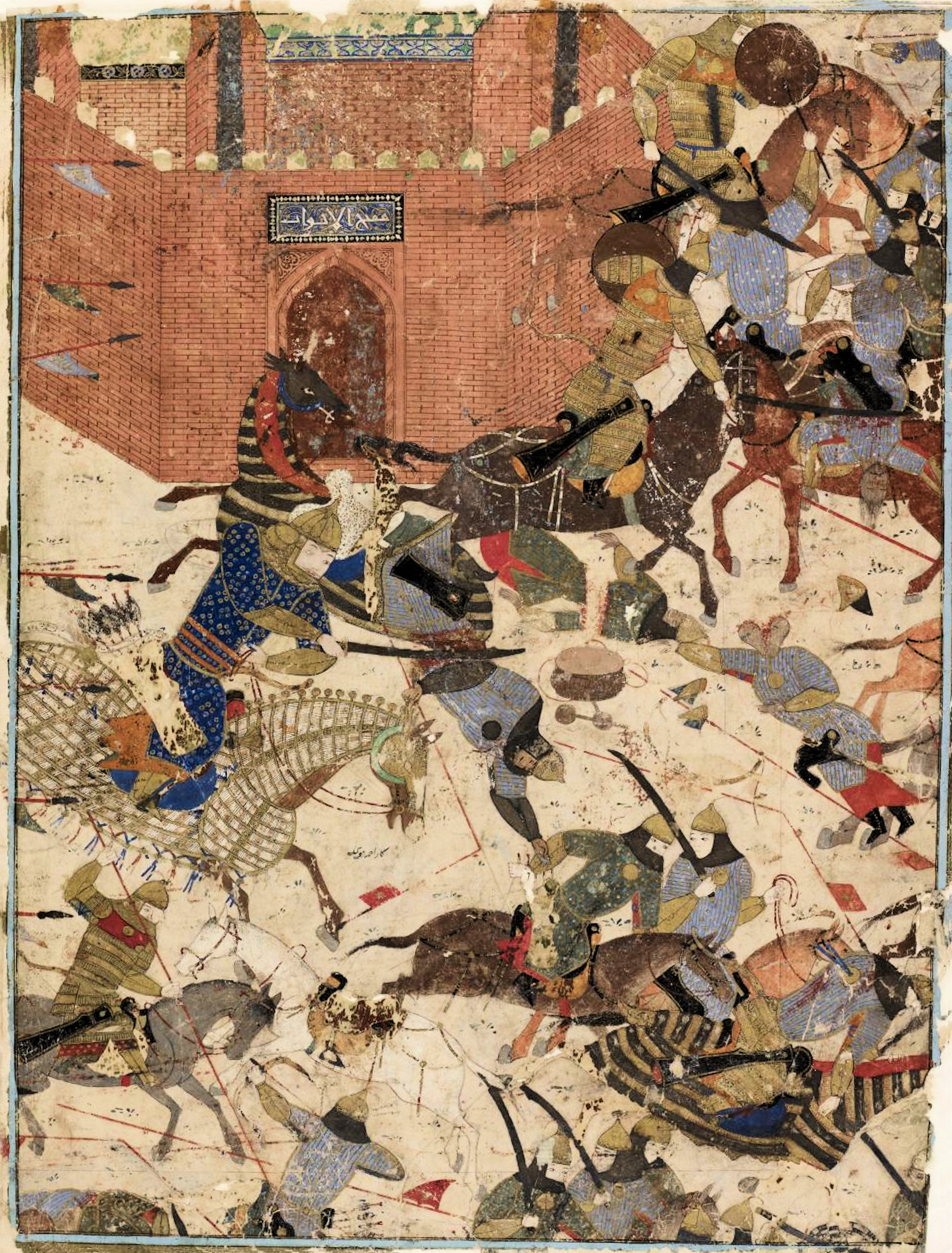
- Equestrian battle in front of a city gate. Rashid ad-Din, Jami al-Tawarikh, 1300-1325
| Date | March 1220 |
| Location | Samarkand, Khwarazmian Empire, present-day Uzbekistan 39°37′N 66°58′E |
| Result | Mongol victory |

Belligerents
| Mongol Empire | Khwarazmian Empire |

Commanders and leaders
| Genghis Khan Ögedei Khan Chagatai Khan; Subutai; Jebe | Jalal al-Din Mangburni; Alpär Jan; Taghday Khan |

Units involved
| Horse archers; Siege engines, including Chinese gunpowder weapons | City garrison |

Strength
| 50,000 troops | 30,000 Qanquli troops, 50,000 local forces, 20 war elephants |

Casualties and losses
| Unknown | 2,500,000 killed (Claim by Ata-Malik Juvayni; exaggerated) |
- Location of the siege on a map of modern Uzbekistan Samarkand (West and Central Asia)

The siege of Samarkand took place in March 1220 after Genghis Khan, founder of the Mongol Empire, had launched a multi-pronged invasion of the Khwarazmian Empire, ruled by Shah Muhammad II. The Mongols had laid siege to the border town of Otrar, but finding its defences obdurate, a large force commanded by Genghis and his youngest son Tolui detached from the vanguard and set off southwards, towards Transoxiana.

Samarkand was the Shah's capital and the pivot of his defence — the city's garrison was large and its battlements were one of the strongest in the empire. Genghis, however, managed to isolate it by capturing and destroying Bukhara in a surprise manoeuvre, and then laying waste to the nearby Transoxianan towns. After repelling relief forces, the Mongol army, now reinforced after the capture of Otrar, ambushed and massacred a sortie by the town's defenders. The citizens of the city soon surrendered at the instigation of the Muslim clergy; most were however enslaved or conscripted in traditional Mongol fashion.

A small force held out in the citadel for around one month, after which around half managed to break through the Mongol lines and escape over the Amu Darya. Although the city was then comprehensively looted and pillaged, it revived slowly under the Pax Mongolica, and then, in the late 14th-century, returned to worldwide prominence as the capital of the Timurid Empire.

== Background ==
=== Forces ===
While medieval chroniclers have attributed huge forces to both sides, modern historians are more conservative in their estimates, but precise numbers are still widely disputed; the only certainty is that the total Mongol force was larger than the Shah's army. The Shah, who distrusted his commanders and had not yet implemented his desired methods of administration, decided on a strategy of distributing troops inside his major cities, such as Samarkand, Balkh and Otrar. It is likely that he expected only a "normal-sized" Mongol raid, which would devastate the countryside but leave the cities unharmed. The Khwarazmids would only previously have fought nomads such as the Kangly, who had no knowledge of siege warfare; that these invaders were bringing a veritable army of engineers who were skilled in siege warfare came as a great shock. In any event, estimates for the city's garrison vary widely.

=== Prelude ===
The first attack on the Khwarazmian Empire made by the Mongols was at the town of Otrar, whose governor had made the grievous mistake of insulting the Khan. This border city, however, was able to hold out for a surprising length of time, and so Genghis made the decision to split his forces to try to outmanoeuvre the Shah. He had learnt of the strength of Samarkand's defences at Otrar, and thus made the decision to march through the Kizil Kum desert to Bukhara. The city was stunned by the Mongol approach, which had been through an area previously thought impassable, and, after a sortie was annihilated along the Amu Darya, the lower town surrendered and was promptly pillaged. The inner citadel held out for less than two weeks, but after the Mongols breached the walls, all inside were massacred. Unlike during later campaigns, the Mongols were comparatively lenient with the citizens of Bukhara; however, a large number were conscripted to be used in the following sieges.

== Siege ==
After the fall of Bukhara, Chinggis Khan advanced along the Zarafshan valley toward Samarkand, one of the most significant cultural and commercial centers of Transoxiana. Positioned between Samarkand, Balkh, and Urganj, his maneuver divided the forces of Muhammad. The city was well-fortified with eight iron gates and defended by approximately 30,000 Qanquli Turkmen and 50,000 local forces under governor Taghday Khan, brother of Turkan Khatun. The garrison also included 20 war elephants. According to Dupuy, Samarkand had a garrison of reportedly 100,000 men. Genghis Khan reached the city in March 1220 and was joined there by his sons, whose forces had previously completed the capture of Otrar. The Mongols encircled Samarkand and repelled a sortie involving the elephants and a cavalry force, killing roughly 1,000 defenders. A large portion of the garrison surrendered on 16 March, leaving only the citadel, defended by about 2,000 soldiers. After one month, a final sortie allowed 1,000 men to escape across the Amu Darya, while the remaining surrendered garrison of approximately 3,000 was executed. Captured elephants released into the countryside quickly died.

== Aftermath ==
After capturing Samarkand, Genghis Khan left Yelü Ahai to administer Samarkand and Bukhara, maintaining order in the cities and securing the Mongol rear. The Mongols developed a reputation for ruthlessness in the region, destroying cities that resisted or rebelled after surrender. Following the fall of Samarkand, part of the Mongol army was sent toward Khojand, where the governor Timur‑Malik organized resistance against the invaders. Timur would eventually restore the city after he made it his capital in 1370. He rebuilt the palaces and the city walls, which were still in ruins, and commissioned numerous mosques, gardens and pavilions to re-establish Samarkand's importance on an international level.

== See also ==
- Afrasiyab
