= Martin B. Dickson =

American historian (1924–1991)

Martin Bernard Dickson
- Born: March 22, 1924
- Died: May 14, 1991 (aged 67)
- Education: University of Michigan (1943), University of Washington (BA, 1948), Princeton University (PhD, 1958).

Martin Bernard Dickson (22 March 1924 – 14 May 1991) was a professor of Near Eastern studies at Princeton University and an historian of Iran and Central Asia, who specialized in Safavid History. His magnum opus, Houghton Shahnameh (2 vols., Cambridge, Mass. 1981), represented a 20-year long cooperation with art historian Stuart Cary Welch, was described as "[A work which] not only delineate the Turkman and Timurid sources of the Safavid idiom, but also try to recapture the personalities of the artists responding to the actors and themes of the stories they painted". Dickson tutored many accomplished specialists of Medieval Iran, such as John E.Woods, Robert D. McChesney and Wheeler Thackston (Harvard).

== History ==
Born in Brooklyn on 22 March 1924, he began his training in Persian at the University of Michigan (1943), towards becoming a cryptographic technician at the Office of Strategic Services. He served in both the Asian and Eastern European theaters of war, adding Russian and Chinese to his repertoire of languages. After the war, he received his BA in Far Eastern Languages and Literature at University of Washington (1948). After receiving his BA, he studied with Zeki Velidi Togan in Turkey and later on to Iran. He did his graduate work at the Department of Oriental Languages and Literature at Princeton University, where he received his Ph.D in 1958 and after spending another year at the Center for Middle Eastern Studies at Harvard University, he joined the Princeton faculty in 1959, became an associate professor in 1964 and a full professor in 1978. became professor of Persian studies in 1959, a position he held until his death in 1991.

In his dissertation, Shah Tahmasb and the Uzbeks (The Duel for Khurasan with ʿUbayd Khan. 930-946/1524-1540), he defined the Safavid political system, focusing on the civil war (924-42/1524-36) that erupted upon the accession of Shah Ṭahmāsb.

== Published works ==
- The Houghton Shahnameh
- The fall of the Ṣafavi dynasty
- Children of the gods
- Uzbek dynastic theory in the XVI-th century.
