= Hafiz-i Abru =

Persian historian at the court of Timurid rulers of Central Asia

- Born: Abd Allah ibn Lutf Allah ibn Abd al-Rashid Bihdadini; Herat, Khorasan (modern-day Afghanistan)
- Died: June 1430; Zanjan, Iran
- Occupation: Historian
- Title: Court Historian

Academic work
- Era: Timurid period
- Notable works: Majma al-tawarikh (The Compendium of History), Zubdat at-tawarikh-i Baysunghuri (Baysunqur’s Cream of History)

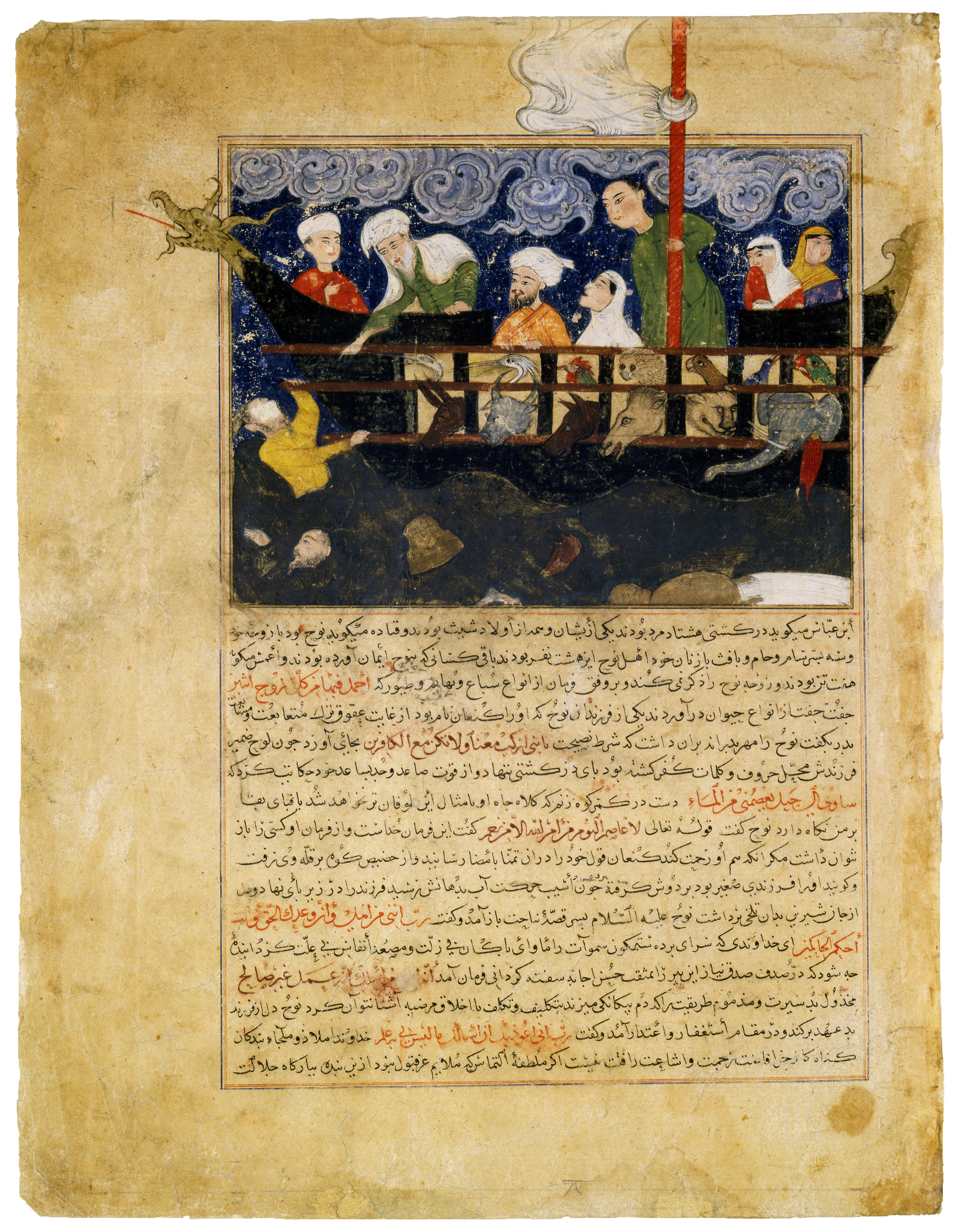
Persian Miniature from Hafiz-i Abru's Majma al-tawarikh. “Noah’s Ark” Iran (Afghanistan), Herat.

Hafiz-i Abru (Note: Also rendered as Hafiz Abru. Less commonly transliterated as Hafez-e Abru, after modern Iranian Persian pronunciation.) (Classical Persian: حافظ ابرو, romanized: Ḥāfiẓ-i Abrū; died June 1430) was a Persian historian working in the court of Shah Rukh. His full name is Abd Allah (or Nur Allah) ibn Lutf Allah ibn Abd al-Rashid Bihdadini. (Note: Also transliterated as "ʿAbd-Allāh (or Nur-Allāh) b. Loṭf-Allāh b. ʿAbd-al-Rašid Behdādini", after modern Iranian Persian pronunciation.)

== Life ==
Hafiz-i Abru was born in Khorasan and studied in Hamadān. He entered Timur's court in the 1380s; after the death of Timur, Hafiz-i Abru continued in the service of Timur's son, Shah Rukh, in Herat. He interacted with other scholars congregating around Timur's and Shah Rukh's courts, and became recognized as a good chess player. In his assessment of the Mausoleum of Sultan Öljaitü, he gave the dimensions while stating "It is a unique monument which has no equal even in the most distant lands."

In 1429, Hafiz accompanied Shah Rukh on the latter's second campaign against the Qara Qoyunlu.

== Works ==
Hafiz is most likely the author of the Dhayl-i Djami' al-tawrikh, a chronicle of the regi of Öljaitü and Abu Sa'id. The initial parts being selections from the Ta'rikh-i Uldjaytu Sultan written by al-Kashani. In 1412, Shah Rukh commissioned him to write the Dhayl-i Zafarnama-yi Shami which covers the last years of Timur's life. He started a translation of an Arabic geographical work, Masalik al-mamalik wa-suwar al-akalim, in 1414 but never finished. He did, however, add its information in his historical work on Fars, Kirman, and Khurasan. Hafiz was also commissioned by Shah Rukh in 1414, to assemble a historical work, Majma al-tawarikh ("World Histories").

== Sources ==
- Binbaş, İlker Evrim (2016). Intellectual Networks in Timurid Iran: Sharaf Al-Dīn 'Alī Yazdī and the Islamicate Republic of Letters. Cambridge University Press. ISBN 9781107054240.
- Ghiasian, Mohamad Reza (2018). Lives of the Prophets: The Illustrations to Hafiz-i Abru’s “Assembly of Chronicles”. ISBN 9789004377226.
- Subtelny, Maria; Melville, Charles (2002). "Ḥāfeẓ-e Abru". Encyclopaedia Iranica, Vol. XI, Fasc. 5. pp. 507–509.
- Tauer, F. (1986). "Hafiz-i Abru". In LEWIS, B.; MENAGE, V. L.; PELLAT, CH.; SCHACHT, J. (eds.). The Encyclopaedia of Islam. Vol. III: H-Iram. E.J. Brill. ISBN 90 04 08118 6.
- Wilbur, Donald N. (1955). The Architecture of Islamic Iran: The Ilkhanid Period. Princeton University Press.
