= Western Siberia =

Geographic region in North Asia

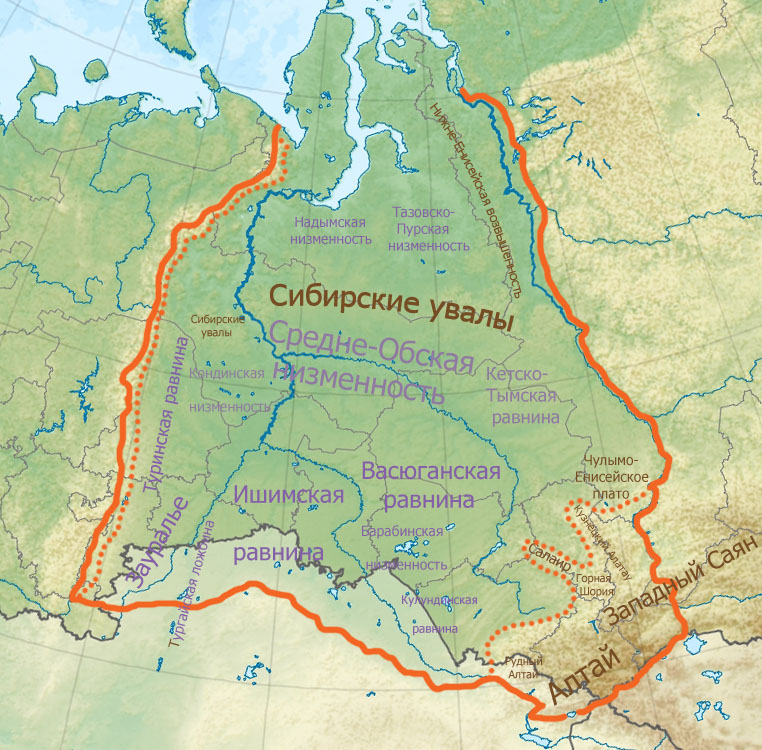
Map of Western Siberia

Western Siberia (Russian: Западная Сибирь, IPA: [ˈzapədnəjə sʲɪˈbʲirʲ]; Kazakh: Батыс Сібір / Batys Sıbır, IPA: [bɑˈtə̥s sɘˈbɘr]) is a region in North Asia. It is part of the wider region of Siberia that is mostly located in the Russian Federation, with a southern part in Kazakhstan. It lies between the Ural region and the Yenisei River, which conventionally divides Siberia into two halves, the other being made up of Central Siberia and Eastern Siberia.

Western Siberia covers an area of 2,590,000 square kilometers (1,000,000 sq mi), nearly 80% of which is located within the West Siberian Plain. The largest rivers of the region are the Irtysh and the Ob. All major rivers of Western Siberia belong to the Kara Sea basin.

The West Siberian petroleum basin is the largest hydrocarbon (petroleum and natural gas) basin in the world covering an area of about 2.2 million km^{2}, and is also the largest oil and gas producing region in Russia.

In medieval times, parts of the region were part of the Golden Horde. After its gradual decline during the 15th century, the Khanate of Sibir, centered on Tyumen, was formed within the area. In the late 16th century, most of Western Siberia was conquered by the Russian Empire, while its southern region became part of the Kazakh Khanate. The current international borders between Russia and Kazakhstan came into being in the late 20th century following the dissolution of the Soviet Union.

== Major cities ==
The most populous city of Western Siberia is Novosibirsk. Other major cities include:

- Omsk
- Tyumen
- Surgut
- Barnaul
- Tomsk
- Kokshetau
- Kemerovo
- Novokuznetsk
- Kurgan
- Pavlodar
- Petropavl
- Semey
- Oskemen
