= John E. Woods (historian) =

American scholar of Islam (born 1938)

John E. Woods is a Professor Emeritus of Iranian and Central Asian History in the Departments of History and of Near Eastern Languages and Civilizations and the College at the University of Chicago.

John Woods received his B.A. from the University of Texas, where he was among the first to receive Title VI funding for the study of Arabic. In 1960, he was also among the first to receive a Fulbright fellowship for the Arabic study, traveling to Cairo to learn Arabic. After a period of study in the University of Tehran, he completed his doctorate in Iranian history from Princeton University in 1974 under the supervision of Martin B. Dickson. In 1970 he first came to teach at University of Chicago, and quickly distinguished himself as a leading scholar of Middle Eastern and Islamic studies. Professor Woods focuses primarily on the history of Turkey, Iran, and Central Asia from the 13th to 18th century. He is particularly interested in aspects of the encounter of sedentary and nomadic people in those regions during that time period. He is at present working on several projects dealing with the age of Chinggis Khan and Timur (Tamerlane). He has played a central role in the Center for Middle Eastern Studies since 1980, serving four terms as director. He has won recognition for excellence in undergraduate and graduate teaching at Chicago and is a recipient of the Farabi International Award for contributions in Iranian and Islamic studies.

In 2014, he received the Quantrell Award.

== Published works ==
The Aqquyunlu: Clan, Confederation, Empire. revised and expanded edition. Salt Lake City: University of Utah Press, 1999.

Fadlullah Khunji-Isfahani's Tarikh-i Alam-ara-yi Amini, Persian text edited by John E. Woods with an abridged English translation by Vladimir Minorsky, revised and augmented by John E. Woods. London: Royal Asiatic Society, 1992 [released 1993].

"Timur's Genealogy," Intellectual Studies on Islam, Essays Written in Honor of Martin B. Dickson, eds. Michel M. Mazzaoui and Vera B. Moreen (University of Utah Press: Salt Lake City, 1990), pp. 85–125.

The Timurid Dynasty, Papers on Inner Asia No. 14, Research Institute for Inner Asian Studies, Indiana University, Bloomington, 1990.

"The Rise of Timurid Historiography," Journal of Near Eastern Studies 48 (1987), pp. 81–108.

"Turco-Iranica II: Notes on a Timurid Decree of 1396/798," Journal of Near Eastern Studies 43 (1984), pp. 331–37.

"Turco-Iranica I: An Ottoman Intelligence Report on Late Fifteenth/Ninth Century Iranian Foreign Relations," Journal of Near Eastern Studies 38 (1979), pp. 1–8.

== See also ==
- Center for Middle Eastern Studies at the University of Chicago
- Islamic scholars
