= Mongol raids into Palestine =

Map of Mongol offensives across the Levant in 1260. Successful campaigns in Aleppo and Damascus led to smaller attacks on secondary targets, such as Baalbek, al-Subayba, and Ajloun, and possibly including Jerusalem as well. Some raiders reached as far south as Gaza.

Mongol military campaigns began extending into Palestine as a result of intermittently successful Mongol invasions of Syria, particularly in 1260 and 1300, when the Ayyubid dynasty was destroyed in Aleppo and Damascus. For a period of a few months after each offensive into Syria, raids were conducted by a relatively small part of the Mongol army, which would characteristically loot, kill, and destroy in a number of areas across the region—reaching as far south as Gaza.

Despite the intensity of these raids, it is not apparent that an intention existed, on either occasion, to annex the Palestine region to the Mongol administrative system. However, the Mongol presence in Palestine and Syria was brief in the face of major battle losses to the Mamluk Sultanate of Egypt, which pushed into the region and decisively routed the Mongol army.

== Mongol campaigns of 1260 ==
With the siege of Baghdad in 1258, the Mongol Empire under Hulegu Khan conquered the Abbasid Caliphate and ended the Islamic Golden Age. After Baghdad, the Mongol forces, including some Christians from the previously conquered or submitted territories of Georgia, Cilician Armenia and Antioch, went on to conquer Syria, the domain of the Ayyubid dynasty. The Mongols took the city of Aleppo, and on March 1, 1260, they conquered Damascus. (Note: "On 1 March Kitbuqa entered Damascus at the head of a Mongol army. With him were the King of Armenia and the Prince of Antioch. The citizens of the ancient capital of the Caliphate saw for the first time for six centuries three Christian potentates ride in triumph through their streets.") (Note: "The king of Armenia and the Prince of Antioch went to the army of the Tatars, and they all went off to take Damascus".)

Upon the fall of Baghdad and later of Damascus, Cairo became the new centre of Muslim power under the Mamluks. The Mongols probably would have continued their advance on through Palestine towards Egypt, but they had to stop their invasion because of an internal conflict in Turkestan. Hulagu departed with the bulk of his forces, leaving only about 10,000 Mongol horsemen in Syria under his Nestorian Christian general Kitbuqa, to occupy the conquered territory.

Kitbuqa continued the offensive, taking the cities and castles of Baalbek, al-Subayba, and Ajlun and sending Mongol raiding parties further into Palestine, reaching as far as Ascalon and possibly Jerusalem. A Mongol garrison of about 1,000 was placed in Gaza. A Mongol detachment under Kushlu Khan caught the garrison of Nablus unawares outside the city. Both Ayyubid commanders, Mujir al-Din ibn Abi Zakari and Nur al-Din 'Ali ibn Shuja' al-Din al-Akta', were killed. The Mongols then garrisoned Nablus. The devastation of their raid on the Samaritan community of Nablus is recorded in the Tolidah. Many men, women and children were killed and ׳Uzzī, son of the High Priest ׳Amram ben Itamar, was captured and brought to Damascus. He was later ransomed by the community.

Hulagu also sent a message to King Louis IX of France, saying that the Mongols had remitted Jerusalem to the Christians. However, modern historians believe that though Jerusalem may have been subject to at least one Mongol raid during this time, that it was not otherwise occupied or formally conquered. (Note: The British historian Steven Runciman believes that Nablus and Gaza were occupied, but that Jerusalem itself was not taken by the Mongols.)

During the Mongol attack on the Mamluks in the Middle East, most of the Mamluks were made out of Kipchaks and the Golden Horde's supply of Kipchaks replenished the Mamluk armies and helped them fight off the Mongols.

=== Battle of Ain Jalut (1260) ===
After retreating from Syria to Cairo, the Egyptian Mamluks negotiated with the Franks of the rump Kingdom of Jerusalem at Acre, and the Franks adopted a position of passive neutrality between the Mamluks and the Mongols even though the Muslim Mamluks had been the traditional enemies of the Crusaders. At the time, the Franks appear to have regarded the Mongols as a greater threat than the Muslims. Thus, the Mamluk forces were permitted to pass through Crusader territory unharmed, and they amassed a sizable force to confront the remains of the Mongol army in September 1260 at the historic Battle of Ain Jalut in Galilee. The Mamluks achieved a major victory, which was important for the region but also was the first time that the Mongol Army had suffered a major defeat. It became the high-water mark for the Mongol conquests, as after this battle, even if the Mongols would again attempt several invasions of Syria, they would not be successful until 1300. Even then, they again would hold territory for only a few months.

=== Sidon incident (1260) ===
The Crusader Julian de Grenier, Lord of Sidon and Beaufort, described by his contemporaries as irresponsible and light-headed, took the opportunity in 1260 to raid and plunder the area of the Bekaa in what had recently become Mongol territory. When the Mongol general Kitbuqa sent his nephew with a small force to obtain redress, they were ambushed and killed by Julian. Kitbuqa responded forcefully by raiding the city of Sidon, destroying walls and slaying Christians although it is said that the castle remained untaken. (Note: "It happened that some men from Sidon and Belfort gathered together, went to the Saracens' villages and fields, looted them, killed many Saracens and took others into captivity together with a great deal of livestock. A certain nephew of Kit-Bugha who resided there, taking along but few cavalry, pursued the Christians who had done these things to tell them on his uncle's behalf to leave the booty. But some of the Christians attacked and killed him and some other Tartars. When Kit-Bugha learned of this, he immediately took the city of the Sidon and destroyed most of the walls [and killed as many Christians as he found. But the people of Sidon fled to an island, and only a few were slain. oe43]. Thereafter the Tartars no longer trusted the Christians, nor the Christians the Tartars." Fleur des Histoires d'Orient, Chap. 30)

== Mongol raids during Edward I's Crusade (1271) ==
In 1269, the English Prince Edward (the future Edward I), inspired by tales of his great uncle, Richard the Lionheart and the Second Crusade of the French king, Louis VII, started on a crusade of his own, the Ninth Crusade. The number of knights and retainers that accompanied Edward on the crusade was quite small, possibly around 230 knights, with a total complement of approximately 1,000 people transported in a flotilla of 13 ships. Many of the members of Edward's expedition were close friends and family, including his wife Eleanor of Castile, his brother Edmund, and his first cousin Henry of Almain.

When Edward finally arrived in Acre on May 9, 1271, he immediately sent an embassy to the Mongol ruler Abaqa.

Edward's plan was to use the help of the Mongols to attack the Muslim leader Baibars. (Note: "Edward was horrified at the state of affairs in Outremer. He knew that his own army was small, but he hoped to unite the Christians of the East into a formidable body and then use the help of the Mongols in making an effective attack on Baibars".) The embassy was led by Reginald Russel, Godefrey Welles and John Parker.

Abaqa answered positively to Edward's request in a letter dated September 4, 1271. The historians Steven Runciman and René Grousset quote the medieval French Estoire d'Eracles, a continuation of the twelfth-century Latin chronicle of William of Tyre:

The messengers that Sir Edward and the Christians had sent to the Tartars to ask for help came back to Acre, and they did so well that they brought the Tartars with them, and raided all the land of Antioch, Aleppo, Haman and La Chamele, as far as Caesarea the Great. And they killed all the Sarazins they found.

— Estoire d'Eracles, p. 461,

In mid-October 1271, the Mongol troops requested by Edward arrived in Syria and ravaged the land from Aleppo southward. Abaqa, occupied by other conflicts in Turkestan, could send only 10,000 Mongol horsemen under general Samagar from the occupation army in Seljuk Anatolia and auxiliary Seljukid troops, but they triggered an exodus of Muslim populations (who remembered the previous campaigns of Kitbuqa) as far south as Cairo. The Mongols defeated the Turcoman troops that protected Aleppo, putting to flight the Mamluk garrison in that city, and continued their advance to Maarat an-Numan and Apamea.

When Baibars mounted a counteroffensive from Egypt on November 12, the Mongols had already retreated beyond the Euphrates, unable to face the full Mamluk army.

== Mongol campaigns of 1299–1300 ==
Mongol offensives in the Levant, 1299–1300

In the summer of 1299, the Mongols under Ghazan successfully took the northern city of Aleppo and defeated the Mamluks in the Battle of Wadi al-Khazandar (also known as the 3rd Battle of Homs), on December 23 or 24, 1299. One group of Mongols under the command of the Mongol general Mulay then split off from Ghazan's army, and pursued the retreating Mamluk troops as far as Gaza, pushing them back to Egypt. The bulk of Ghazan's forces then proceeded to Damascus, which surrendered sometime between December 30, 1299, and January 6, 1300, but its Citadel resisted. Ghazan then retreated most of his forces in February, probably because their horses needed fodder. Ghazan also promised to return in November to attack Egypt.

Accordingly, there existed a period of about four months, from February to May 1300, when the Mongol Il-Khan was the de facto lord of the Holy Land. The smaller force of about 10,000 horsemen under Mulay engaged in raids as far south as Gaza, returned to Damascus around March 1300 and, a few days later, followed Ghazan back across the Euphrates.

The Egyptian Mamluks then returned and reclaimed the entire area in May 1300 without a battle.

=== Fate of Jerusalem in 1300 ===
Medieval sources give many different views of the extent of the raids in 1299 and 1300, and there is disagreement among modern historians as to which of the sources are most reliable and which might be embellished or simply false. The fate of Jerusalem, in particular, continues to be debated, with some historians stating that the Mongol raids may have penetrated the city and others saying that the city was neither taken or even besieged.

The most often-cited study of the matter is that by Dr. Sylvia Schein in her 1979 article "Gesta Dei per Mongolos". She concluded, "The alleged recovery of the Holy Land never happened." However, in her 1991 book, Schein includes a brief footnote saying that the conquest of Jerusalem by the Mongols was "confirmed" because they are documented to have removed the Golden Gate of the Dome of the Rock in 1300, to transfer it to Damascus. That was based on an account from the 14th century priest Niccolo of Poggibonsi, who gave a detailed architectural description of Jerusalem and mentioned the acts of the Mongols on the gate. Another scholar, Denys Pringle, described Poggibonsi's account as saying that the Mongols tried to destroy, undermine, burn or remove the gate but without success, and when the Mamluks returned, they had the gate walled up.

In his 2007 book, Les Templiers, Alain Demurger states that the Mongols captured Damascus and Jerusalem, and that Ghazan's general Mulay also was "effectively present" in Jerusalem in 1299-1300. According to Frederic Luisetto, Mongol troops "penetrated into Jerusalem and Hebron where they committed many massacres." In The Crusaders and the Crusader States, Andrew Jotischky used Schein's 1979 article and later 1991 book to state, "after a brief and largely symbolic occupation of Jerusalem, Ghazan withdrew to Persia".

In his 1987 article, "Mongol raids into Palestine", Reuven Amitai stated, "It seems most likely then that the Mongols raided Palestine by themselves in 1299–1300. The Mongol forces rode as far as Gaza, looting and killing as they went, and they entered several towns, including Jerusalem. In the end, all the raiders returned to the Damascus area... by the middle of March 1300."

==== European rumours about Jerusalem ====
Whatever the truth may have been, the Mongol advance led to wild rumours in Europe at the time, that perhaps the Mongols had captured Jerusalem and were going to return it to the Europeans. These rumours, starting around March 1300, were probably based on accounts from Venetian merchants who had just arrived from Cyprus. The account gave a more or less accurate picture of the Mongol successes in Syria but then expanded to say that the Mongols had "probably" taken the Holy Land by that point. The rumours were then inflated widely by wishful thinking, and the urban legend environment of large crowds that had gathered in Rome for the Jubilee. The story grew to say (falsely) that the Mongols had taken Egypt, that the Mongol Ghazan had appointed his brother as the new king there and that the Mongols were next going to conquer Barbary and Tunis. The rumours also stated that Ghazan had freed the Christians who were held captive in Damascus and in Egypt and that some of those prisoners had already made their way to Cyprus.

By April 1300, Pope Boniface VIII was sending a letter announcing the "great and joyful news to be celebrated with special rejoicing," that the Mongol Ghazan had conquered the Holy Land and offered to hand it over to the Christians. In Rome, as part of the Jubilee celebrations in 1300, the Pope ordered processions to "celebrate the recovery of the Holy Land" and further encouraged everyone to depart for the newly recovered area. King Edward I of England was asked to encourage his subjects to depart as well, to visit the Holy Places. Pope Boniface even referred to the recovery of the Holy Land from the Mongols in his bull Ausculta fili.

In the summer of the Jubilee year (1300), Pope Boniface VIII received a dozen ambassadors, dispatched from various kings and princes. One of the groups was of 100 Mongols, led by the Florentine Guiscard Bustari, the ambassador for the Il-khan. The embassy, abundantly mentioned in contemporary sources, participated in the Jubilee ceremonies. Supposedly, the ambassador was also the man nominated by Ghazan to supervise the re-establishment of the Franks in the territories that Ghazan was going to return to them.

There was great rejoicing for a short time, but the Pope soon learned about the true state of affairs in Syria, from which, in fact, Ghazan had withdrawn the bulk of his forces in February 1300, and the Mamluks had reclaimed by May. However, the rumours continued until at least September 1300.

== See also ==
- Franco-Mongol alliance
