= Siege of Mayyafariqin =

1259–1260 siege

- Part of Mongol invasions of the Levant
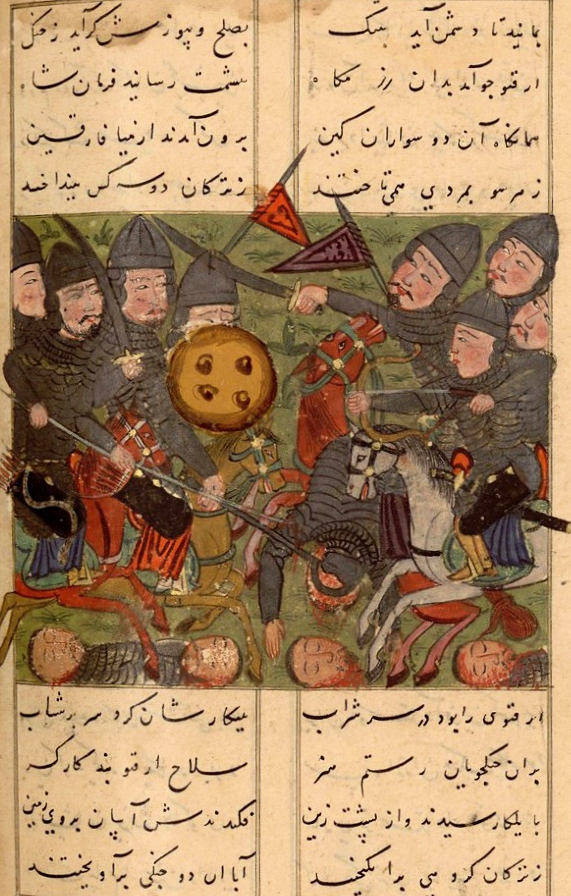
- Battle of Mayyafaraqin. Chingizid Shâhnâma by Shams al-Dîn Kâshânî, 1423
Date	Summer 1259 – 7 April 1260
Location	Mayyafariqin 39.703318°N 38.230024°E
Result	Mongol victory

Belligerents
Ilkhanate; Zakarids; Proshyans; Lu'lu'ids	Ayyubid dynasty

Commanders and leaders
Yoshmut; Chaghatai; Prosh Khaghbakian; Shahnshah Zakarian; Al-Salih Isma'il ibn Lu'lu'	Al-Kamil Muhammad †
- Location of the Siege of Mayyafariqin Siege of Mayyafariqin (West and Central Asia)

The siege of Mayyafariqin in 1259–1260 was a Mongol siege against the last Ayyubid ruler Al-Kamil Muhammad in his city of Mayyāfāriqīn (modern Silvan, Diyarbakır). The siege of Mayyāfāriqīn closely followed the 1258 siege of Baghdad and marked the beginning of the Mongol campaigns in Syria.

In spring 1259, the Armenian Prince Prosh Khaghbakian, together with his Armenian Zakarid suzerain Shahnshah, led a large force of Georgians and Armenians to support a much smaller force of Mongol troops of Hulegu headed by his son Yoshmut in the siege of Mayyāfāriqīn (Diyarbakır), which was defended by its last Ayyubid ruler Al-Kamil Muhammad. Military units of Cilician Armenia also participated, and would soon after participate to the Mongol siege of Damascus (1260) as well. The son and successor of the Turkic Zengid ruler Badr al-Din Lu'lu', named Isma'il ibn Lu'lu' (1259–1262), continued in his father's steps and also supported the Mongol troops of Hulagu in the siege of Mayyāfāriqīn with troops and siege engineers.

The horrors of the long siege were recounted by the contemporary Armenian historian Kirakos:

They ate clean and unclean animals and then started to eat people when there was no more food. The strong ate the weak. When the [supply of] poor people was exhausted they turned against one another. Fathers ate sons, and women ate their daughters; and they did not spare the fruit of their wombs. Lovers renounced their loved ones and friends, their acquaintances. And the food supply had so diminished that one litr of human flesh sold for seventy dahekans. Men and food were entirely exhausted, and not just there [in the city], but danger threatened many other districts for those who were besieging the city harassed the land already subjugated by the Tatars with tax collecting and with conveying food and drink for them. Many people died from the extreme cold of the snow which covered the mountains in wintertime.

— Kirakos, History of Armenia.

When the city was captured at last after a siege of two years, the Muslims were massacred, but the Christians were spared. Christian relics were collected and brought back to Armenia, particularly to the Haghpat Monastery.

The Armenian Prince Sevata of Kachen was killed in the conflict. According to the Armenian writer Vartan, he "won the immortal crown, ever faithful to God and to the il-khan; he will share the triumph of those who shared their blood for Christ". Yoshmut was recalled by his father after 10 months.

Finally the Ayyubid ruler Al-Kamil Muhammad was killed when Mayyafariqin fell to the Mongols on 7 April 1260 (23 Rabia II 658).

Meanwhile Hulegu continued his conquest of the rest of Syria, accompanied by the forces of Hethum I of the Armenian Kingdom of Cilicia and the Crusaders of Bohemond VI of Antioch. The Georgian ruler David VII declined to commit more Georgian-Armenian troops for these Mongol campaigns in Syria, on account that he had suffered huge losses in the 1258 siege of Baghdad. Of the remaining Ayyubid states in Syria, Aleppo fell in the siege of Aleppo (1260), while Homs, Hama and Damascus submitted peacefully.
