= Al-Salih Isma'il ibn Lu'lu' =

Emir of Mosul
- Rule: 1259-1262
- Predecessor: Badr al-Din Lu'lu'
- Successor: None
- Died: 1262
- Father: Badr al-Din Lu'lu'
- Religion: Sunni Islam

Al-Salih Isma'il ibn Lu'lu' was the son of the ruler of Mosul Badr al-Din Lu'lu'. He succeeded his father and ruled Mosul for only three years (1259-1262) before his city was lost to the Mongols in the Siege of Mosul (1261).

== Mongol allegiance ==
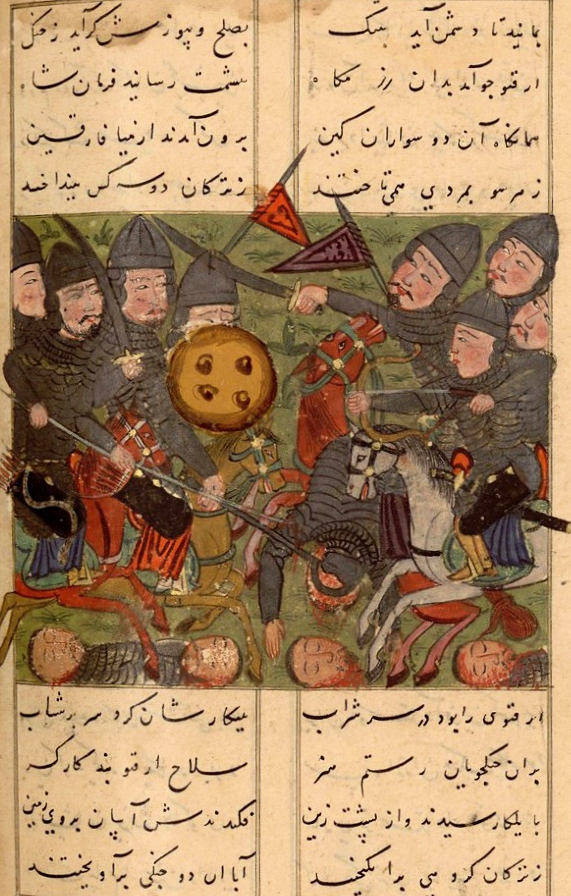
Al-Salih Isma'il participated to the Siege of Mayyafariqin. Chingizid Shâhnâma by Shams al-Dîn Kâshânî, 1423

His father Badr al-Din Lu'lu had been a close collaborator of the Il-Khanate, and through Mongol intercession, his son Al-Salih Isma'il was married in 1258 to a daughter of the last ruler of the Khwarizmian Empire Jalal al-Din, who had been raised at the Mongol court in Karakorum since her capture in 1231 at the age of two, named Turkan Khatun. Because of her Mongolian education, she was wearing the Mongol costume, but she followed the Islamic rites for her marriage.

At the end of his life, Badr ad-Dīn Lu'Lu' agreed for his son Al-Salih Isma'il to participate to the Syrian campaign of Hulagu. Al-Salih, who was put in charge of the Siege of Mayyafariqin in summer 1259–7 April 1260, with troops and siege engineers. Meanwhile, Hulegu campaigned at the head of an army of 120,000 men, including Turkish, Georgian, and Armenian contingents (numbering 12 000 cavalrymen and 40 000 infantrymen for the latter), continuing to Edessa and Antioch.

== Revolt and Mamluk allegiance ==
After the death of his father and the Mongol defeat in the Battle of Ain Jalut (3 September 1260) against the Mamluks, Isma'il sided with the latter and revolted against the Mongols. Al-Salih Isma'il rejected Mongol sovereignty, and in 1261 entered into relations with Baybars, ruler of the Mamluk Sultanate. In 1261, Al-Salih travelled with his son and other notables of Mosul first to Syria and then to Cairo, where they were entertained by Baybars; they then accompanied the Mamluk army back into Syria.

During his six-month absence, however, Al-Salih's wife Turkan Khatun seized control of Mosul and refused entry to a group of Mamluks. This action incited a popular revolt, which forced her and her supporters into the city's citadel, and then led to the persecution of the Christians of Mosul, who were suspected of being in league with the Mongols. A small Mongol force then arrived to assert authority and killed all the Mamluks in a short skirmish, before encircling Mosul and preparing to siege it. Hearing of these events, Al-Salih travelled back to Mosul, and slipped through the light defences on 15 November 1261 to reassert his rule over the city.

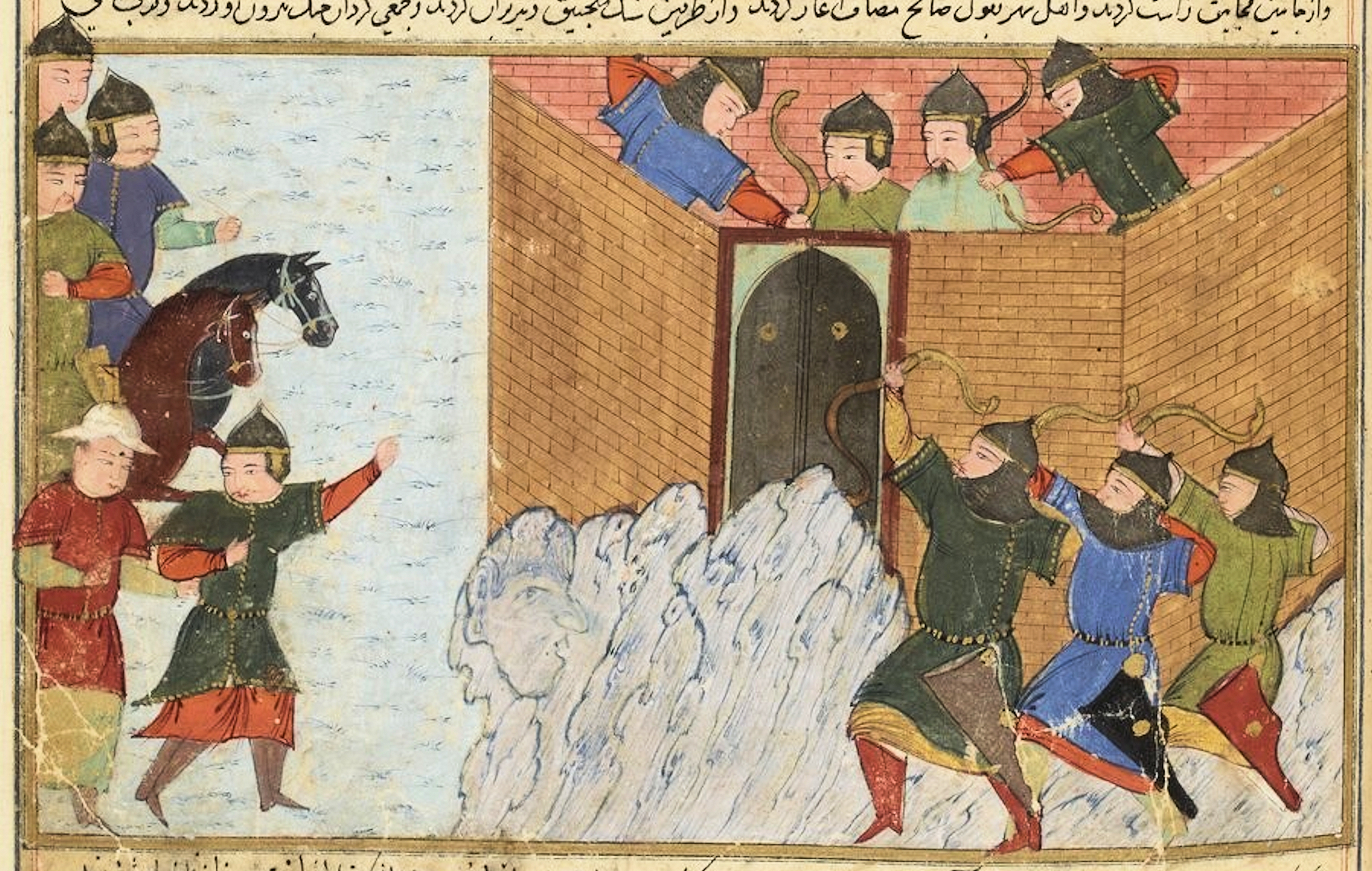
A Persian miniature depicting the Siege of Mosul (1261). Rashid-al-Din, Jami' al-tawarikh, 1430, Herat

Mosul was placed under siege by a larger Mongol army commanded by Samdaghu in late 1261, in the Siege of Mosul (1261). Mosul fell to the Mongols when Al-Salih Isma'il surrendered in the summer of 1262, after around six months under siege.

Although the Mongols had promised the ruler he would be spared, they put him to death along with his three-year-old son, whose body they reportedly cut in half and displayed as a grim warning. Isma'il was later subjected to a harsh death.

The Mongols then appointed al-Ba'shiqi to govern Mosul, making him the first Christian to hold that position under their authority. Sandaghu went on to take Jazirat ibn 'Umar in 1263, completing the capture of Lu'lu'id lands.

Al-Salih Isma'il ibn Lu'lu' had two other brothers, Al-Mujahid Ishaq and al-Muzaffar 'Alī who were welcomed at the court of Baybars in Egypt in 1261. They were provided with lands and resources, and while active in the service of the Mamluk rulers, continued to claim for the Mosul throne until the 1280s, although unsuccessfully.

== Sources ==
- Amitai-Preiss, Reuven (1995). Mongols and Mamluks: The Mamluk-Ilkhanid War, 1260–1281. Cambridge University Press. ISBN 9780521471329.
- Boyle, J. A. (1968). The Cambridge History of Iran, Volume 5: The Saljuq and Mongol Periods. Cambridge: Cambridge University Press. ISBN 9780521069366.
- Jackson, Peter (2017). The Mongols and the Islamic World: From Conquest to Conversion. London: Yale University Press. ISBN 9780300227284.
- Morton, Nicholas (2022). The Mongol Storm: Making and Breaking Empires in the Medieval Near East. London: Basic Books. ISBN 9781399803588.
- Patton, Douglas (1991). Badr al-Din Luʾluʾ: Atabeg of Mosul. Seattle: University of Washington Press. ISBN 9780295971568.
- Venegoni, L. (2003). Transoxiana Webfestschrift Series I, Webfestschrift Marshak 2003. Eran ud Aneran: studies presented to Boris Il'ic Marsak on the occasion of his 70th birthday (1. ed.). Venezia: Cafoscarina. ISBN 8875431051.
