= Bastari =

Bastari is a surname. Notable people with the surname include:

- Guicciardo Bastari, 13th-century Florentine adventurer
- Zenel Bastari (c. 1767 – c. 1837), Albanian poet
