= Capture of Damascus (1299) =

Mongol capture of Damascus

- Part of the Mongol raids into Palestine of Ilkhanid–Mamluk war
- Mongol offensives in the Levant, 1299–1303
Date	28 December 1299 – 5 February 1300
Location	Damascus, Syria
Result	Ilkhanid victory
Territorial changes	Ilkhanid occupation of Damascus

Belligerents
Ilkhanate	Mamluk Sultanate

Commanders and leaders
(Ilkhanate) Ghazan Khan	Unknown

The Capture of Damascus (1299) was the occupation of the city of Damascus by the forces of the Ilkhanate under Ghazan Khan during the Ilkhanid–Mamluk war. Following the Mongol victory over the Mamluk Sultanate at the Battle of Wadi al-Khazandar in December 1299, Mongol forces advanced into Syria and entered Damascus after it was abandoned by its defenders.

== Background ==
Ghazan’s defeat of the Mamluk army in December 1299 left the Ilkhanids in a strong position in Syria. With the Mamluk forces retreating back toward Egypt in a weakened state, Mongol control could spread quickly through much of the region. As Ghazan moved south, Homs offered no resistance and the town and citadel surrendered, after which the Ilkhanid army continued in the direction of Damascus. Denise Aigle notes that Ghazan’s status as a Muslim ruler and his declaration of an amān (safe-conduct) made Ilkhanid rule easier for Damascus to accept, especially given local resentment toward Mamluk exactions.

== Capture ==
Ghazan’s victory near Homs allowed the Ilkhanid army to advance toward Damascus. As Mongol forces approached, the city was abandoned by its defenders, and Damascene notables sought terms from Ghazan in late December 1299. Ghazan camped at Marj Rahit east of Damascus and accepted the city’s submission. Ilkhanid authority was formally acknowledged on 8 January 1300 when the Friday khutba in Damascus was proclaimed in Ghazan’s name. Following the occupation, Ghazan appointed Qibjaq and the Mongol commander Outlūshāh as joint governors of Damascus.

== Aftermath ==
The Mongol withdrawal from Syria came almost as quickly as their advance. Ghazan left Damascus on 5 February 1300, possibly because of reports of Qarauna raids in southern Persia, though the exact reason for his departure is unclear. Qutlugh-Shah, who had been left in command at Damascus, attempted to besiege the citadel, which continued to resist even after the town had capitulated. After only a few days, he abandoned the siege and withdrew to follow Ghazan. By early May 1300, Mongol forces had evacuated Syria, and Egyptian forces had already reoccupied Damascus and restored Mamluk rule across the region. Ghazan soon returned to Persia after the occupation and announced that he intended to return to conquer Egypt, but the Ilkhanid position in Syria collapsed after the Mongols were defeated in 1303 at the Battle of Marj al-Saffar.
