= Siege of Mosul (1261) =

Siege by the Ilkhanate against the Zengids of Mosul

- Part of the Mongol conquest of Persia and Mesopotamia and the Mamluk–Ilkhanid War
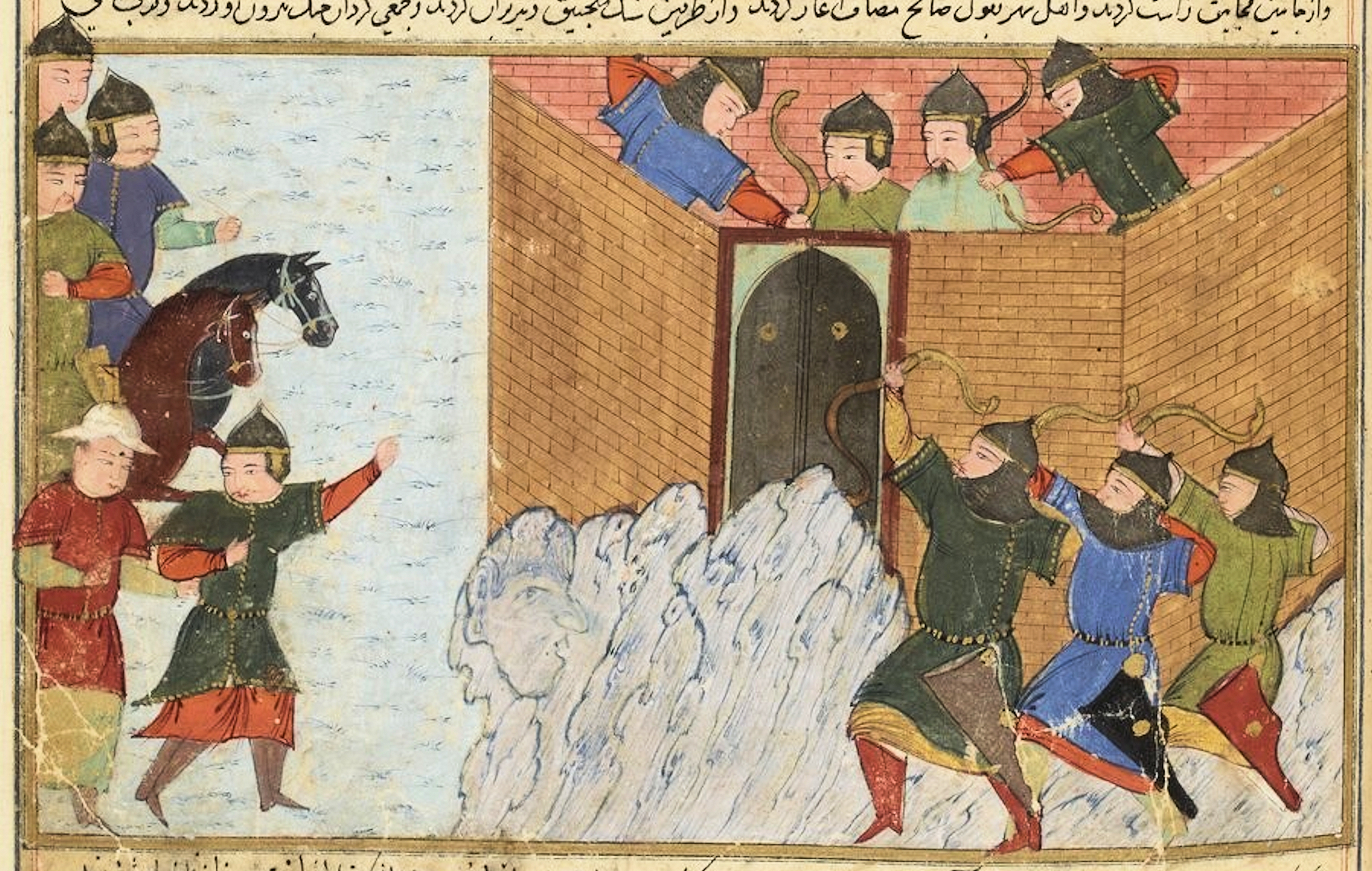
- A Persian miniature depicting the siege of Mosul from Rashid-al-Din
Date	Late 1261 – July/August 1262
Location	Mosul, Jazira Region (modern-day Iraq) 36°20′N 43°08′E
Result	Mongol victory

Belligerents
Ilkhanate (Mongol Empire)	Luluid dynasty Mamluk Sultanate

Commanders and leaders
Samdaghu	Al-Salih Isma'il (executed); Al-Barli (WIA)

Strength
10,000	Mosul garrison, and a 1,200–1,400-strong relief force

Casualties and losses
Unknown	Heavy
- Location of the siege in modern-day Iraq Mosul (West and Central Asia)

The Siege of Mosul took place from late 1261 to July–August 1262, during the Mamluk–Ilkhanate War.

Mosul's ruler Badr al-Din Lu'lu' had made a gesture of submission to the Ilkhanate of Hulegu Khan by 1243. But after his death in 1261, his son and successor Al-Salih Isma'il repudiated Mongol sovereignty and entered into relations with Baybars, ruler of the Mamluk Sultanate. In 1261, Al-Salih travelled with his son and other notables of Mosul first to Syria and then to Cairo, where they were entertained by Baybars; they then accompanied the Mamluk army back into Syria.

During his six-month absence, however, Al-Salih's wife Turkan Khatun seized control of Mosul and refused entry to a group of Mamluks. This action incited a popular revolt, which forced her and her supporters into the city's citadel and then persecuted the Christians of Mosul, who were suspected of being in league with the Mongols. A small Mongol force then arrived to assert authority and killed all the Mamluks in a short skirmish, before encircling Mosul and preparing to siege it. Hearing of these events, Al-Salih travelled back to Mosul, and slipped through the light defences on 15 November 1261 to reassert his rule over the city.

Mosul was placed under siege by a larger Mongol army commanded by Samdaghu in late 1261. They built a wooden wall around the city and launched a heavy barrage, hurling missiles into it. Despite repeated assaults, the siege dragged on. Mosul was a large city with a big population and strong defences. The siege continued until July–August 1262, during which the garrison and local population suffered greatly. During the siege, the Mamluk commander Al-Barli marched to aid Mosul with about 1,200–1,400 men, while the Mongol army was reportedly around 10,000 strong. Some Mongols considered withdrawing when they learned of his approach, but Al-Zayn Al-Hafizi, the former official of Al-Nasir Yusuf, urged them to confront the relief force. As the Mamluk relief army drew near Mosul, their commander sent a carrier pigeon to alert the city's defenders that he would soon arrive. The Mongols however intercepted the pigeon and used the message to overcome the relief force before it could reach its destination. The two sides fought near Sinjar on 7 May 1262, where Al-Barli's relief force was defeated, although he escaped wounded and with a small part of his army.

Mosul fell to the Mongols when Al-Salih Isma'il surrendered in the summer of 1262. After around six months under siege, the city surrendered. Although the Mongols had promised the ruler he would be spared, they put him to death along with his three-year-old son, whose body they reportedly cut in half and displayed as a grim warning. Isma'il was later subjected to a harsh death, and much of the rest of the population was massacred, although many craftsmen were spared. The fall of Mosul marked the end of organized resistance to the Mongols in Kurdistan, thus securing Ilkhanid control over the region. The Mongols also appointed al-Ba'shiqi to govern Mosul, making him the first Christian to hold that position under their authority. Sandaghu went on to take Jazirat ibn 'Umar in 1263, bringing an end to the sons of Lu'lu' in the northern part of Iraq.

== Bibliography ==
- Amitai-Preiss, Reuven (1995). Mongols and Mamluks: The Mamluk-Ilkhanid War, 1260–1281. Cambridge University Press. ISBN 9780521471329.
- Atwood, Christopher P. (2004). Encyclopedia of Mongolia and the Mongol Empire. New York: Facts On File. ISBN 9780816046713.
- Boyle, J. A. (1968). The Cambridge History of Iran, Volume 5: The Saljuq and Mongol Periods. Cambridge: Cambridge University Press. ISBN 9780521069366.
- Jackson, Peter (2017). The Mongols and the Islamic World: From Conquest to Conversion. London: Yale University Press. ISBN 9780300227284.
- Morton, Nicholas (2022). The Mongol Storm: Making and Breaking Empires in the Medieval Near East. London: Basic Books. ISBN 9781399803588.
- Patton, Douglas (1991). Badr al-Din Luʾluʾ: Atabeg of Mosul. Seattle: University of Washington Press. ISBN 9780295971568.
