= Attack on Limassol (1271) =

Naval raid on Cyprus by the Mamluk Sultanate

- Part of the Lord Edward's crusade
Date	Mid June 1271
Location	Limassol, Cyprus
Result	Cypriot victory

Belligerents
Kingdom of Cyprus	Mamluk Sultanate

Commanders and leaders
Hugh III of Cyprus	Unnamed two admirals (POW)

Strength
Unknown	11 galleys

Casualties and losses
Unknown	9 ships lost 1,800 captured

The Attack on Limassol occurred in the mid-June of the year 1271, when the Mamluk fleet launched a sea raid against the port of Limassol in Cyprus. The raid ended in a fiasco for the Mamluk fleet due to strong winds.

== History ==
In the year 1271, the Mamluks under Sultan Baybars captured the fortress of Montfort Castle. Afterwards, he marched to Acre after hearing the arrival of Prince Edward's crusade. Baybars attempted to provoke the Crusaders, but that didn't work. Baybars withdrew from Acre. When Edward arrived in Acre, he was accompanied by Hugh III of Cyprus. When Baybars learned of his arrival, he attempted to lure him away from Acre to free his rear for his attack on Montfort and get Hugh's forces away; he attempted to attack the island of Cyprus. Baybars wrote to the fleet in Cario to attack the island.

In mid-June of 1271, a fleet of 11 galleys sailed from Egypt and went to Cyprus. The Mamluks painted their galleys black and had crosses on their flags to deceive the Cypriots. The Mamluk fleet, however, was led by two inexperienced admirals who did not get along. When the Mamluk fleet approached the city of Limassol during the night, strong winds alongside piloting errors blew the fleet offshore of the city. The Mamluk crew and troops were left stranded offshore. The Cyrpiots, seeing what happened, quickly advanced and captured the entire Mamluk force, numbering 1,800 men, including the two admirals. Only two ships managed to survive the fiasco and return to Alexandria.

Hugh dispatched a letter to the Sultan, mocking him for what happened to his fleet. In response, Baybars announced that he had taken Montfort and that a victory won by sword was different from one won by a favorable wind. Baybars immediately ordered the construction of twenty new galleys and transferred them to Alexandria. Most of the Mamluk prisoners were transferred to Acre for ransom, although a large number of them were able to escape.

== Sources ==
- Peter Thorau (1993), The Lion of Egypt: Sultan Baybars I and the Near East in the thirteenth century.
- Brian Todd Carey (2023), Warfare in the Age of Crusades. The Latin East.
- Adrian Boas (2015), The Crusader World.
- Jaroslav Folda (2005), Crusader art in the Holy Land : from the Third Crusade to the fall of Acre, 1187–1291.
