= Battle of Qaqun =

1271 battle of Lord Edward's Crusade

Battle of Qaqun (1271)
- Part of Lord Edward's crusade
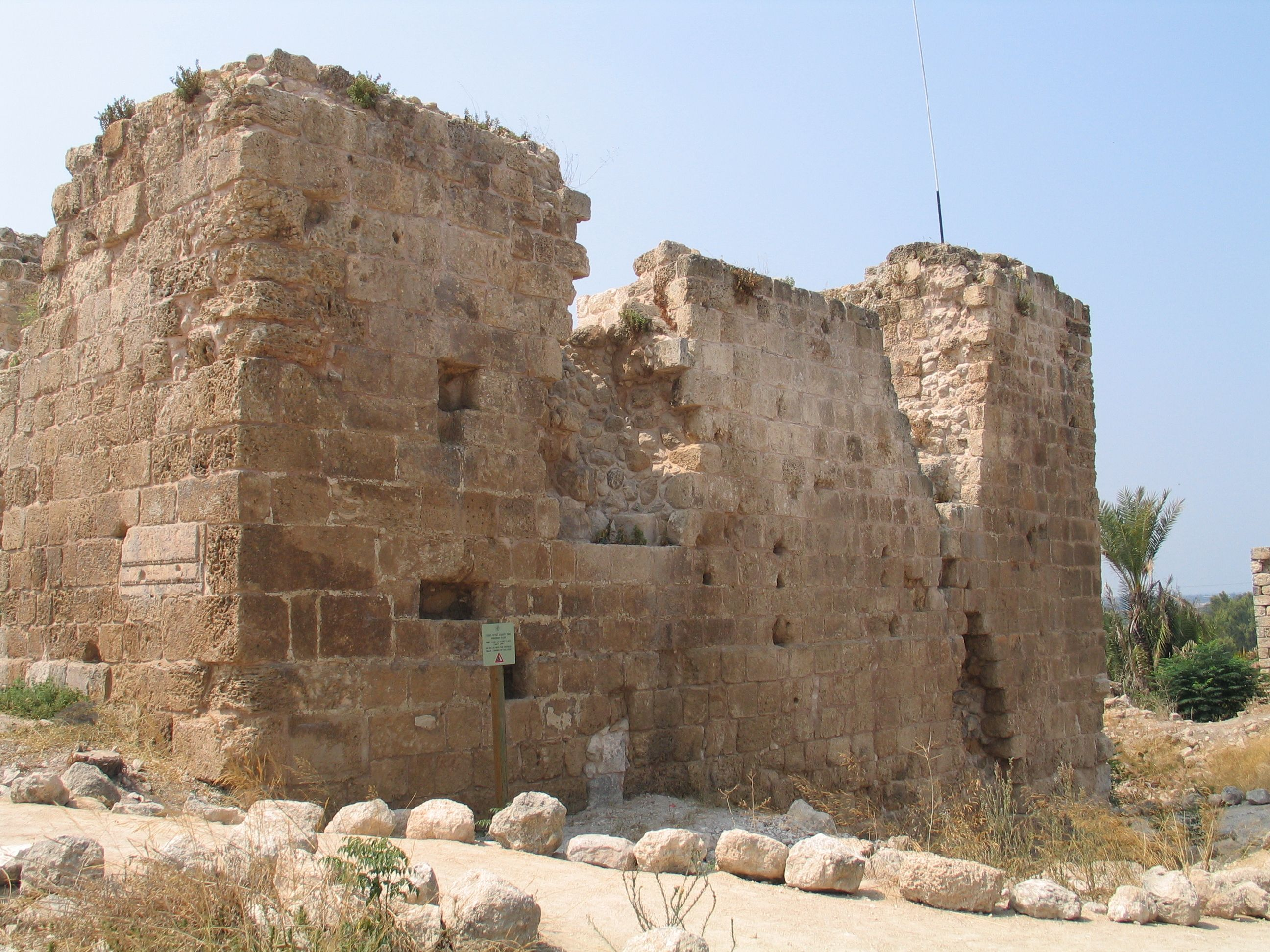
- Qaqun fortress
Date	23 November 1271
Location	Qaqun
Result	Mamluk victory

Belligerents
Kingdom of England; Kingdom of Jerusalem; Kingdom of Cyprus; Knights Templar; Knights Hospitaller; Teutonic Order	Mamluk Sultanate

Commanders and leaders
Prince Edward; Edmund Crouchback; Hugh III of Jerusalem	Husam al-Din Ustdar †; Baybars al-Jaliq (WIA); Aqush al-Shamsi

Strength
200–300 knights 500 infantry	Unknown

Casualties and losses
Heavy	Heavy

The Battle of Qaqun (Note: Arabic: معركة قاقون, romanized: Maerakat Qaqun) (Note: Christopher Marshall and Kate Raphael call it a siege.) (Note: Ibn al-Furāt and Michael Prestwich call it a raid.) was a military engagement between the Crusaders and the Mamluks in Qaqun. The Crusaders, who were led by Prince Edward, led a raid against the Mamluk fortress of Qaqun. Initially successful, the Crusaders failed to take Qaqun and were routed by a Mamluk relief force.

== Background ==
Shortly after the Eighth Crusade, the English Crusaders led by Prince Edward decided to sail towards the holy land. The Crusaders arrived in Acre on May 9, 1271. Edwards made plans for an offensive against the Muslims. Edward dispatched an embassy to the Mongol Ilkhanate ruler, Abaqa Khan, discussing plans for a coordinated attack against the Mamluks. While waiting for Abaqa's response, Edward launched a raid against St. Georges-de-Lebeyne. The raid ended in failure after his men got sick in the summer heat. The Mongols responded to Edward's call, and in October they raided North Syria. However, it was forced to retreat upon the approach of the Mamluk army led by Baybars.

== Battle ==
On November 23, Edward left Acre, with 200–300 knights and around 500 footsoldiers, for another raid. Edward's brother Edmund Crouchback had reinforced his troops from Acre and Cyprus, who were led by Hugh III. The military orders, Templars, Hospitallers, and Teutons, joined Edward's raid. This time, the Crusaders targeted the fort of Qaqun, 40 miles southeast of Acre. Heading south and slightly inland, they proceeded cautiously, marching mostly at night. When the Crusaders arrived, they met a large number of Turkomen herdsmen. The Crusaders attacked them, killing many of them and capturing a large number of cattle.

The Crusaders then attacked the Qaqun. The Mamluk garrison managed to hold their ground, despite the death of the emir, Husam al-Din Ustdar. Another emir, Baybars al-Jaliq, was wounded during the fight. Despite this, the Crusaders failed to capture the castle, and soon the Mamluk army, which was stationed at Ayn Jalut, arrived to relieve the fort. The Crusaders were forced to retreat to Acre. The Mamluks chased the Crusaders, killing many of them, including their horses, took back the cattle, and liberated a number of Turkomens who were captured.

The Mamluk relief was force was led by Jamal al-Din Aqush al-Shamsi. Frankish sources mention that had it not been for the arrival of the Mamluk relief force, the Crusaders would've been able to capture it.

== Aftermath ==
The Crusader raid on Qaqun ended in failure. Baybars attempted to retaliate by attacking Acre in December, but due to heavy rains, the Mamluk Sultan was forced to retreat to Egypt. The Crusaders realized there was little chance for any successful campaigning while the Mamluks grew tired of fighting. Both sides agreed to a 10-year truce in May 1272. Edward was furious with the peace treaty. Edward would leave the Holy Land on September 24, 1275.

According to the Estoire d'Eracles, Baybars reportedly commented on the Crusader's failed attack on Qaqun, stating:

If so many men cannot take a house, they are unlikely to conquer the Kingdom of Jerusalem.

== Sources ==
- Amitai, Reuven (2024). The Mongols in the Islamic Lands: Studies in the History of the Ilkhanate (online ed.). New York: Routledge. ISBN 978-1-040-24202-5.
- Ibn al-Furāt, Muḥammad ibn ʻAbd al-Raḥim (1971). Riley-Smith, Jonathan (ed.). Ayyubids, Mamlukes and Crusaders: The translation. Translated by Lyons, Malcolm Cameron; Lyons, Ursula. Heffer.
- Lower, Michael (2018). The Tunis Crusade of 1270: A Mediterranean History. Oxford University Press. ISBN 978-0-19-874432-0.
- Marshall, Christopher (2023). Warfare in the Latin East, 1192-1291. Cambridge University Press. ISBN 9781009441506.
- Prestwich, Michael (1997). Edward I (revised ed.). New Haven: Yale University Press. ISBN 978-0-300-07157-3.
