= Fall of Montfort Castle =

Coordinates: 33°02′41″N 35°13′34″E

Fall of Montfort Castle (1271)
- Part of Crusades
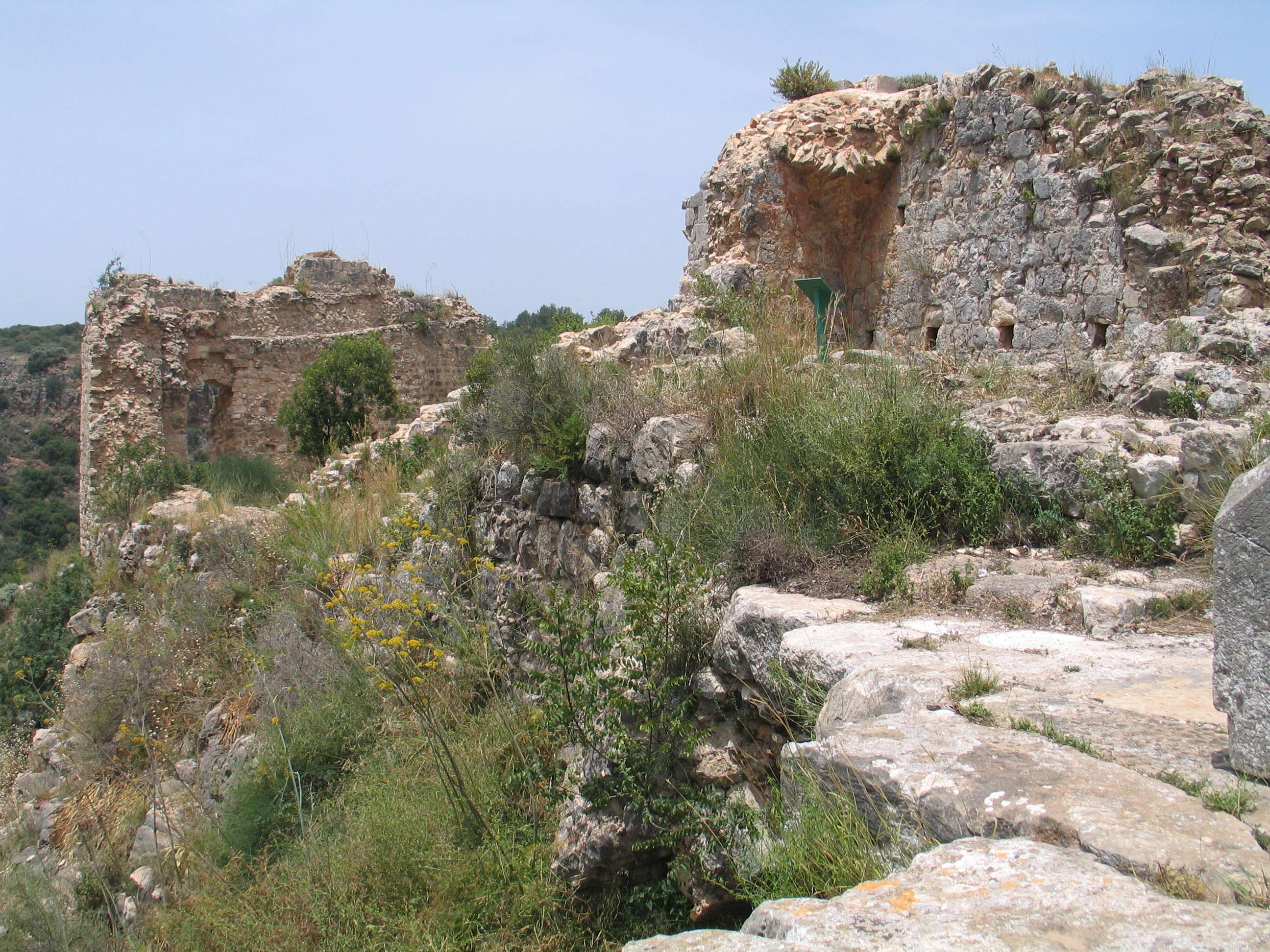
- Ruins of Montfort Castle
| Date | 8–23 June 1271 |
| Location | Montfort Castle |
| Result | Mamluk victory |

Belligerents
| Teutonic Order | Mamluk Sultanate |

Commanders and leaders
| Anno von Sangershausen | Baybars |

Strength
| Unknown | Unknown |

Casualties and losses
| Heavy | Unknown |

The Fall of Montfort was the capture of Montfort Castle, the headquarters of the Teutonic Order, by the Mamluks, who were led by the Sultan Baybars.

== Background ==
In 1271, the Mamluk Sultan, Baybars, began his campaigns against the Crusader states in the Levant. His first target was the castle Krak des Chevaliers. He managed to capture it alongside Gibelacar. Baybars then launched an attack against Tripoli. However, Baybars heard of the arrival of Prince Edward's crusade to Acre. Baybars made peace with Tripoli to meet Edward. Baybars went to Damascus and left there on June 5. On his way he stopped at the Montfort Castle. Montfort Castle originally belonged to Joscelin III in the 12th century. It was later sold to the Teutonic Order. The Teutons rebuilt the castle and expanded it. The Teutons took the castle as their headquarters and the residence of the Grand Master. The Mamluks attempted to besiege the castle in 1266 but were repelled.

== Siege ==
The Mamluks arrived at Montfort on June 8. They encamped on the two mountain ridges to the south and east of the fortress. They set up three big mangonels and several smaller ones. The Mamluks encamped in a valley near the stream. The Mamluks assaulted and captured the Rabad, or castle town, on June 11 after three days of fighting. The next day, the Mamluks assaulted and captured the Bashura, or the outer walls. The Mamluks took the Bashura as a refuge. The Teutons retreated to the castle. The Mamluks besieged them and began undermining the castle, which successfully caused damage. The Mamluks also bombarded the castle. Seeing the bad positions, the Teutons surrendered on June 23. The Teutons were allowed safe passage to Acre.

== Aftermath ==
Montfort Castle was held in high regard by the Crusaders, and during the siege, several Crusader envoys from Acre and Cyprus attempted to persuade the Sultan from besieging the castle, but Baybars refused. The Mamluks demolished the castle, and after 12 days of work, the Mamluks left for Acre.

== Sources ==
- Rabei G. Khamisy (2016), Montfort, History, Early Research, and Recent Studies of the Principal Fortress of the Teutonic Order.
- Vardit R. Shotten-Hallel & Rosie Weetch (2020), Crusading and Archaeology: Some Archaeological Approaches to the Crusades.
- Adrian Boas (2006), Archaeology of the Military Orders: A Survey of the Urban Centers, Rural Settlements, and Castles of the Military Orders in the Latin East (c.1120-1291).
- Michael S. Fulton (2018), Artillery in the Era of the Crusades, Siege Warfare and the Development of Trebuchet Technology.
