= Guiscard Bustari =

13th-century Florentine adventurer

Guiscard Bustari (Italian: Guicciardo Bastari or Guiscardo de' Bastari; fl. late 13th century) was a Florentine Italian adventurer and ambassador, who was employed by the Mongol Il Khan ruler Ghazan.

In the summer 1300, Guiscard Bustari is recorded to have led an embassy of one hundred Mongols sent by Ghazan to Pope Boniface VIII in the occasion of that year's Jubilee. The Mongols, clad in traditional clothes, participated to the Jubilee organized by the Pope, and made a sensation. Ghazan asked the Pope to send troops, priests and peasants, in order to make the Holy Land a Frank state again in the aftermath of the Mongol incursions in the region.

Bustari has also been identified with the person who negotiated Charles II of Anjou's release of Strena di Bonfante da Pisa, who had been captured during the 1299 Battle of Cape Orlando.

== Sources ==
- Petech, Luciano (1970). "BASTARI, Guicciardo". Dizionario Biografico degli Italiani (in Italian). Vol. 7: Bartolucci–Bellotto. Rome: Institute of the Italian Encyclopaedia. ISBN 978-88-12-00032-6.
- Schein, Sylvia (1979). "Gesta Dei per Mongolos 1300". The English Historical Review.
- Foltz, Richard (2010). Religions of the Silk Road (2nd ed.). Palgrave Macmillan. ISBN 978-0-230-62125-1.
