= Reuven Amitai =

Israeli-American historian and writer (born 1955)

- ראובן עמיתי
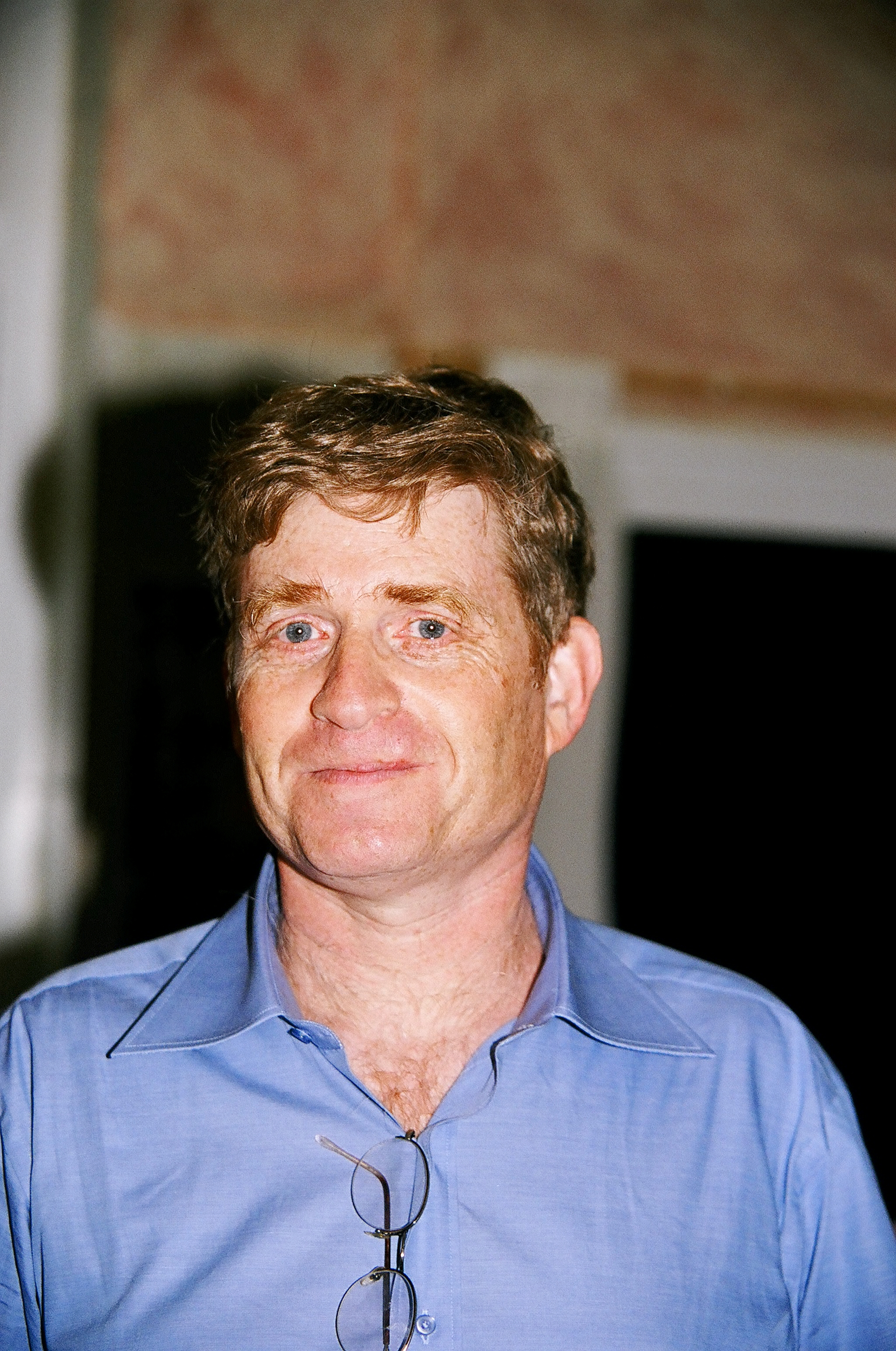
- Born: August 23, 1955 (age 71); Philadelphia, Pennsylvania, United States
- Education: University of Pennsylvania
- Known for: Pre-modern Islamic studies

Reuven Amitai (Hebrew: ראובן עמיתי; born August 23, 1955), also Reuven Amitai-Preiss, is an Israeli-American historian and writer, specializing in pre-modern Islamic civilization, especially Syria and Palestine during the time of the Mamluk Empire. In his 20s he moved to Israel, and became history professor at the Hebrew University of Jerusalem. As of 2012 he is the Dean of the Faculty of Humanities at the Hebrew University.

== Biography ==
Amitai was born in Philadelphia in 1955, and studied at the University of Pennsylvania Department of Oriental Studies. In 1976 he made the aliyah to Israel, intending to live and work on a kibbutz while also pursuing Middle Eastern Studies. He worked at the kibbutz for six years as a welder, and then decided to return to academic studies. He enrolled at the Hebrew University of Jerusalem, where he eventually received a Masters and Doctorate, focusing on the history of Islam, especially during the time of the Crusades, the Mamluks, and the Mongol Empire, a time period spanning the 11th to 16th centuries. He spent a year as a visiting fellow at Princeton University from 1990–91, and St. Antony's College in Oxford from 1996–97. Returning to the Hebrew University, he became a teacher, then Chairman of the Department of Islamic and Middle Eastern Studies from 1997–2001, and director of the Institute of Asian and African Studies twice, in 2001–04 and 2008–10. Around 2005, he became director of the Nehemia Levtzion Center for Islamic Studies, whose goal was to encourage research public activity related to Islamic studies. From 2010 to 2014, he served as Dean of the Faculty of Humanities at the Hebrew University of Jerusalem.

== Selected publications ==
=== Books ===
- Amitai-Preiss, Reuven (1995). Mongols and Mamluks: The Mamluk-Îlkhânid War, 1260–1281. Cambridge, UK; New York, USA: Cambridge University Press. ISBN 978-0-521-46226-6.

=== Articles ===
- "The Conversion of Tegüder Ilkhan to Islam". Jerusalem Studies in Arabic and Islam (XXV): 15–43. 2001.
- "In the Aftermath of 'Ayn Jâlût: The Beginnings of the Malmûk-Îlkhânid Cold War". Al-Masaq (10): 1–21. 1990.
- Amitai-Preiss, Reuven (1992). "Mamluk Perceptions of the Mongol-Frankish Rapprochement". Mediterranean Historical Review. 7: 50–65. doi:10.1080/09518969208569631.
- "A Fourteenth-Century Mamluk Inscription from Rural Palestine". Israel Exploration Journal (44): 234–242. 1994.
- Theresa Fitzherbert & Julian Raby, ed. (1996). "New material from the Mamluk sources for the biography of Rashid al-Din". The Court of the Il-khans, 1290-1340 (Conference paper). Oxford & New York: Oxford University Press. pp. 23–37.
- Amitai-Preiss, Reuven (1996). "Ghazan, Islam, and Mongol tradition: a View from the Mamluk Sultanate". Bulletin of the School of Oriental and African Studies. 59: 1–10. doi:10.1017/s0041977x00028524.
- "A Note on a "Mamlûk" Drum from Bethsaida". Israel Exploration Journal (47): 113–116. 1997.
- Amitai, Reuven (1987). "Mongol Raids into Palestine (A.D. 1260 and 1300)". Journal of the Royal Asiatic Society (2). Cambridge, UK; New York, USA: Cambridge University Press: 236–255. JSTOR 25212151.
- Gervers, Michael; Powell, James M., eds. (2001). "Edward of England and Abagha Ilkhan: A reexamination of a failed attempt at Mongol-Frankish Cooperation". Tolerance and Intolerance: Social Conflict in the Age of the Crusades. Syracuse, New York, USA: Syracuse University Press. pp. 75–82. ISBN 978-0-8156-2869-9.
- Nicola Di Cosmo, ed. (2002). "Whither the Ilkhanid Army? Ghazan's First Campaign into Syria (1299–1300)". Warfare in Inner Asian History (500-1800). Leiden-Boston-Köln: Brill.
- "'Ayn Jalût Revisited". Tarih (2): 119–150. 1992.
- "An Exchange of Letters in Arabic between Abaya Îlkhân and Sultan Baybars (A.H. 667/A.D. 1268-69)". Central Asiatic Journal (38/1): 11–33. 1994.
- Morgan, David; Amitai-Preiss, Reuven, eds. (1999). "Mongol Imperial Ideology and the Îlkhânid War against the Mamlûks". The Mongol Empire and its Legacy. Leiden, The Netherlands: Brill. ISBN 978-90-04-11048-9.
- Amalia Levanoni; Michael Winter, eds. (2004). "The Mongol Occupation of Damascus in 1300: A Study of Mamluk Loyalties". The Mamluks in Egyptian and Syrian Politics and Society. Leiden-Köln-Boston: Brill. pp. 21–39.
- John Prior, ed. (2006). "The Logistics of the Mongol-Mamlûk War, with Special Reference to the Battle of Wâdî'l-Khaznadâr, 1299 C.E.". Logistics of Warfare in the Age of Crusades (Proceedings of a Workshop Held at the Center for Medieval Studies, University of Sydney, 30 Sept.-4 Oct. 2002). Ashgate: Ashgate Publishing Company. pp. 25–42.
