= Chingizid Shâhnâma =

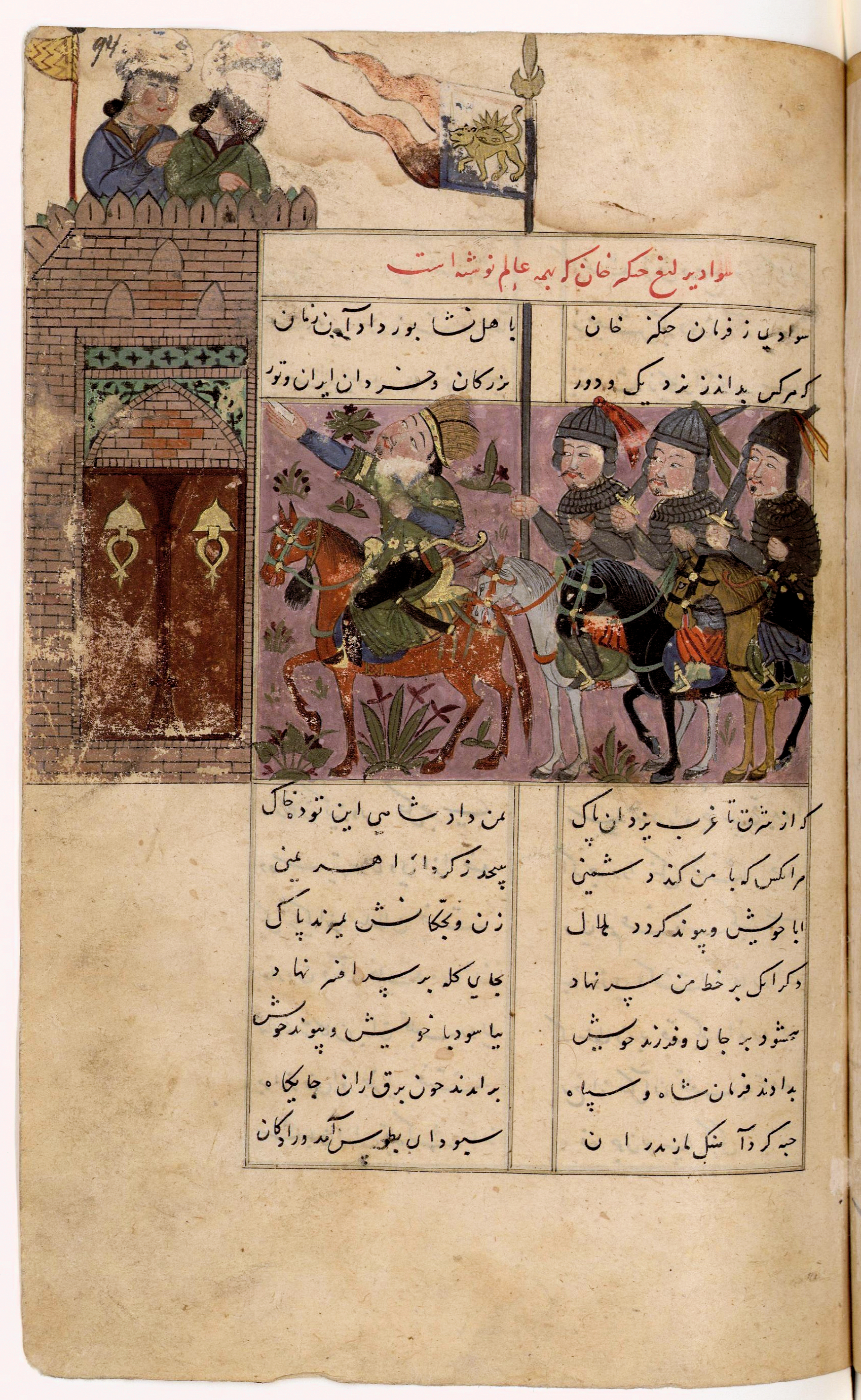
- Envoys of Genghis Khan at the Siege of Nishapur (1221). Chingizid Shâhnâma by Shams al-Dîn Kâshânî, 1423
- Author: Shams al-Dîn Kâshânî (author); Ahmad b. Shaykh Mahmud al-Abiwardi (copyist)
- Publication date: 1423

The Chingizid Shâhnâma, also Shâh-nâma-i tchingîzî (شهنامهٔ چنگیزی, "The Book of Kings of Chingiz" or "The Chingizid Shâh-nâma"), was a chronicle of the period of the life of Genghis Khan and his family. Only one manuscript is extant, dating to 1423, Iraq.

The manuscript in the Bibliothèque Nationale (Shâh-nâma-i tchingîzî (Bibliothèque nationale Supplément persan 1443)) was created in the 14th century by Shams al-Dîn Kâshânî. The copyist was Ahmad b. Shaykh Mahmud al-Abiwardi. It contains 25 miniatures.

The text is a versified version of Rashid al-Din's 14th century Jami' al-tawarikh ("Compendium of Chronicles"), created during the reign of Öljeitü. The chronicle was created by Shams al-Dîn, probably at the request of Ghazan Khan. According to the preface of the author, it was intended as a straightforward versification of Rashid al-Din's 14th century Jami' al-tawarikh, but the manuscript then derived from its original purpose and evolved by incorporating sections of advice and exemplary tales, complete with anecdotes about Alexander the Great, Bahrām Gur or Anushirvan.

It is sometimes considered as a "very mediocre" history of the Mongol Empire, from the origins to the period of Oljaitu.
