= Battle of Wadi al-Khaznadar =

1299 Mongols–Mamluk conflict

Coordinates: 34°44′12″N 36°42′56″E

- Part of the Mongol invasions of the Levant
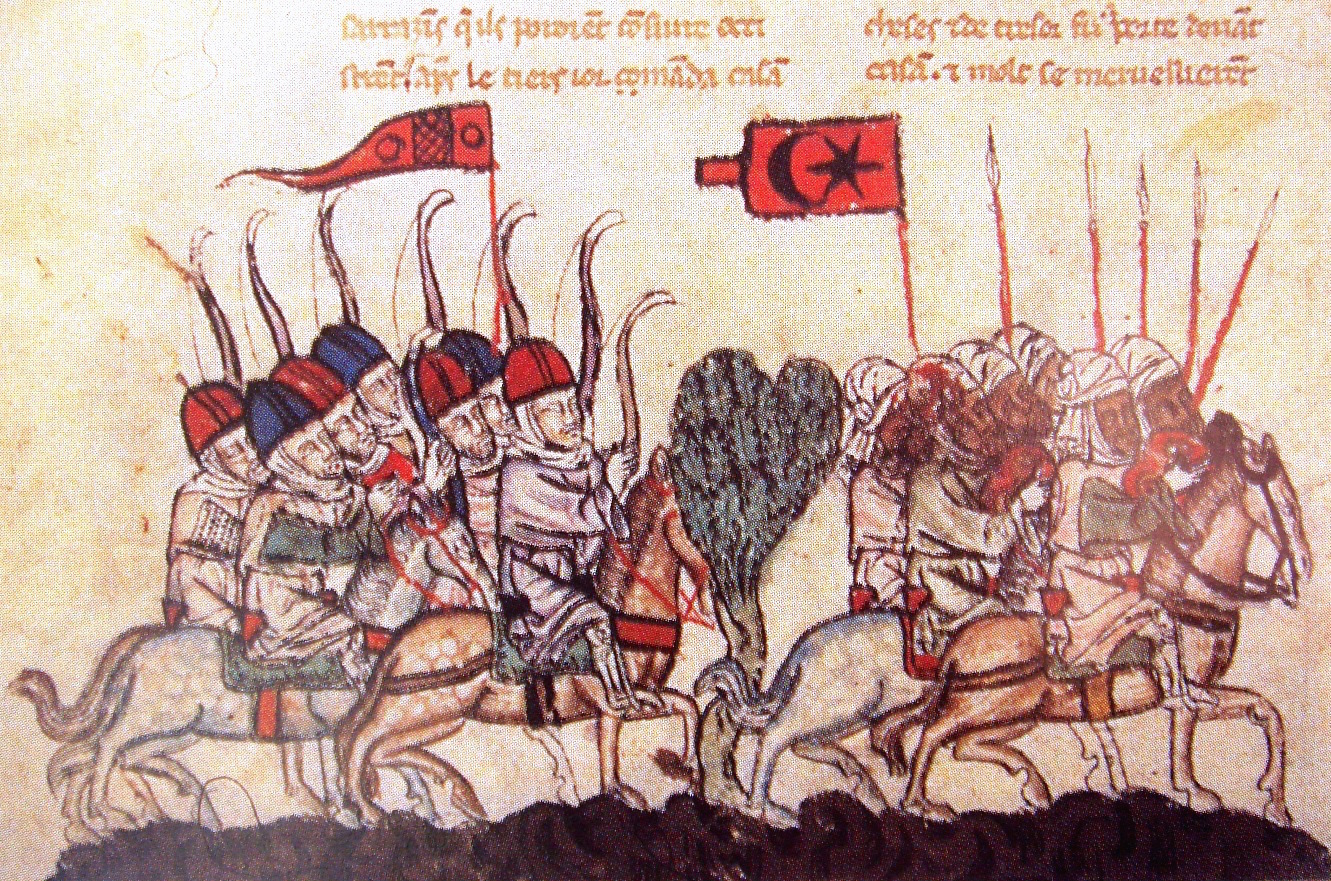
- 14th century illustration from a manuscript of the History of the Tatars depicting Mongol archers and Mamluk cavalry
| Date | December 22–23, 1299 |
| Location | Wadi al-Khaznadar, north-east of Homs |
| Result | Ilkhanate victory |

Belligerents
| Ilkhanate; Kingdom of Georgia; Cilician Armenia | Mamluk Sultanate |

Commanders and leaders
| Ghazan Khan; Qurumushi | Al-Nasir Muhammad; Emir Aydar al-Mansuri †; Emir Barlghi al-Jafari † |

Strength
| 7,000–10,000 | 10,000–30,000 |

Casualties and losses
| Unknown | 1,000–5,000 |

The Battle of Wadi al-Khaznadar, also known as the Third Battle of Homs, was a Mongol victory over the Mamluks in 1299.

== Background ==
In 1260, Hulagu Khan had invaded the Middle East to Palestine. Before he could follow up with an invasion of Egypt, he was called back to Mongolia. He left two tumens (20,000 men) under general Kitbuqa. This army was defeated at the Battle of Ain Jalut and the Mongols were expelled from Palestine and Syria. Hulagu returned with another force, but his invasion was permanently delayed after his cousin Berke of the Golden Horde (who had converted to Islam) secretly allied with the Mamluks and instigated a civil war in the Caucasus.

After recovering the Levant, the Mamluks went on to invade the Armenian Kingdom of Cilicia and the Seljuk Sultanate of Rum, both Mongol protectorates, but they were defeated, forcing them back to Syria.

In 1299, nearly 20 years after the last Mongol defeat in Syria at the Second Battle of Homs, Ghazan Khan and an army of Mongols, Georgians, and Armenians, crossed the Euphrates river (the Mamluk-Ilkhanid border) and seized Aleppo. The Mongol army then proceeded southwards until they were only a few miles north of Homs.

The Sultan of Egypt Al-Nasir Muhammad who was in Syria at the time marched with an army of 20,000 to 30,000 Mamluks (more, according to other sources) northwards from Damascus until he met the Mongols two to three Arab farsakhs (6–9 miles) north-east of Homs at Wadi al-Khaznadar on 22 December 1299 at 5 o'clock in the morning. The sun had already risen.

== Battle ==
The battle started with the Mamluk cavalry charging the Mongols. Then the Mongol heavy cavalry charged at the Mamluks while Mongol archers stood behind their horses and peppered the Mamluks with arrows.

It seems that early on in the battle, the two forces ended up in hand-to-hand combat.

Eventually in the afternoon, the Mamluk right flank had been broken through by the Mongols and the Mamluk army began to rout upon hearing about the Mongol breakthrough. Messages between sections of the army could take hours to reach the other side of the battlefield.

The Mongols capitalized on the breakthrough, eventually gaining complete control of the battlefield and routed the remaining Mamluk army.

Mongol operations in the Levant, 1299–1303, showing the location of the Battle of Wadi al-Khaznadar (3rd Homs)

== Casualties ==
Mamluk sources state that only 200 Mamluk soldiers had been killed whilst Mongol casualties numbered 5,000-10,000. These figures are considered false as an important factor in the battle was that the right flank of the Mamluks had collapsed yet only 200 soldiers died during the entire battle.

Despite the apparent casualty disparity, it is assumed from the fact that the Mongols were left in control of the battlefield and went on to capture Damascus that the Mamluks suffered a "serious reverse".

== Aftermath ==
The Mamluk army fled southwards towards Damascus. However, en route, they were constantly harassed by 12,000 Maronite and Druze bowmen. One group of Mongols under General Mulay then split off from Ghazan's main force and pursued the Mamluks as far as Gaza, pushing them back to Egypt.

The Mongols, who had claimed a "great victory", continued their march south until they reached Damascus. The city was soon sacked and its citadel besieged.

There were no concerted Christian efforts to build on the Mongol victories and the Mamluks were soon in repossession of Syria and Palestine after the Mongol withdrawal. Participation of the Georgian and Armenian troops in the campaign was unrelated to the Western Christian Crusades.

After the Battle of Wadi al-Khaznadar, the Mongols kept pushing into Palestine, eventually reaching Jerusalem. Small raiding parties raided throughout Palestine as far as Gaza until the Mongol army withdrew in 1300 out of the need for fodder for their horses and to repel an invasion by the Chagatai Khanate.

== Sources ==
- Adh-Dhababi's Record of the Destruction of Damascus by the Mongols in 1299-1301(https://web.archive.org/web/20100124054605/http://www.deremilitari.org/resources/articles/somogyi1.htm)
- Henry Hoyle Howorth (1876). History of the Mongols: From the 9th to the 19th Century. Longmans, Green, and Co.
- Amitai-Preiss, Reuven (2009) Mongols and Mamluks: The Mamluk-Ilkhanid War, 1260–1281 (Cambridge Studies in Islamic Civilization). Cambridge University Press, England. ISBN 978-0-5115-6348-5, p. 219.
- Mazor, Amir (2015) The Rise and Fall of a Muslim Regiment: The Mansuriyya in the First Mamluk Sultanate, 678/1279-741/1341. Bonn University Press, Germany. ISBN 978-3-8471-0424-7
- Demurger, Alain (2007). Jacques de Molay. París: Editions Payot & Rivages. ISBN 2-228-90235-7.
