= Lord Edward's crusade =

European crusade to the Holy Land, 1271–1272

Lord Edward's Crusade
- Part of the Crusades
- Operations during Lord Edward's crusade Mamluks Crusaders Mongols
Date	1271 – May 1272
Location	Levant
Result	Inconclusive (see aftermath)

Belligerents
Kingdom of England; Kingdom of Cyprus; Kingdom of Jerusalem; Antioch-Tripoli; Ilkhanate; Military orders: Knights Templar; Knights Hospitaller; Teutonic Order	Mamluk Sultanate; Bahris

Commanders and leaders
Edward Longshanks; Edmund Crouchback; Hugh III of Cyprus; Bohemond VI of Antioch; Abaqa Khan; Samagar	Baibars

Lord Edward's Crusade, sometimes called the Ninth Crusade, was a military expedition to the Holy Land under the command of Edward Longshanks, later king of England, in 1271–1272. In practice an extension of the Eighth Crusade, it was the last of the Crusades to reach the Holy Land before the fall of Acre in 1291, which brought an end to the permanent crusader presence there.

The crusade saw Edward clash with the Egyptian Mamluk sultan Baibars, with both achieving limited victories. The Crusaders were ultimately forced to withdraw since Edward had pressing concerns at home and felt unable to resolve the internal conflicts within the remnant Outremer territories. It also foreshadowed the imminent collapse of the last remaining crusader strongholds along the Mediterranean coast.

== From Dover to Acre ==
Following the Mamluk victory over the Mongols in 1260 at the Battle of Ain Jalut by Qutuz and his general Baibars, Qutuz was assassinated, leaving Baibars to claim the sultanate for himself. As sultan, Baibars proceeded to attack the Christian crusaders at Arsuf, Atlit, Haifa, Safad, Jaffa, Ascalon, and Caesarea. As the Crusader fortress cities fell one by one, the Christians sought help from Europe, but assistance was slow in coming.

In 1268, Baibars captured Antioch, thereby destroying the last remnant of the Principality of Antioch, securing the Mamluk northern front and threatening the small Crusader County of Tripoli. With royal and papal approval, Edward "took the cross" on 24 June 1268. Louis IX of France organized a large crusader army with the intent of attacking Egypt, but diverted it instead to Tunis. Louis himself died there in 1270. He had lent Edward 70,000 livres tournois for his crusade.

Edward and his brother Edmund prepared an expedition to join Louis at Tunis, but it was delayed several times in the summer of 1270 because their father, King Henry III of England, could not make up his mind whether to join it or not. On the advice of his councilors, he opted to stay in England and the crusaders embarked at Dover on 20 August. Unusual for the time, they were accompanied by Edward's wife Eleanor of Castile throughout. There is some debate around the place and month of departure, Portsmouth or Dover, August or September; Dover is certainly more likely, the month less certain.

Edward traveled slowly through France, arriving in Aigues-Mortes, the same port from which Louis had embarked, in late September (a month later than expected). He went from there to Sardinia, where he waited a month before crossing to Tunis, where he arrived on 10 November, too late for the fighting. In fact, the Treaty of Tunis that ended the crusade had been signed on 30 October. Although Edward had played no role in its negotiation, the treaty obligated its signatories—Philip III of France, Charles I of Sicily and Theobald II of Navarre—to prevent Edward from attacking Tunis. Edward was also excluded from receiving a portion of the indemnity paid to the crusaders for leaving.

On 18 November, Charles granted Edward a safe-conduct allowing him to stay in Sicily while contemplating his next steps. Although the other crusaders decided each to return home, Edward opted to continue on his way to the Holy Land to assist Bohemund VI, Prince of Antioch and Count of Tripoli, against the Mamluk threat to the remnant of the Kingdom of Jerusalem. On May 9, 1271 Edward finally arrived at Acre with a fleet of eight sailing vessels and thirty galleys. He brought a small but not insignificant contingent of no more than 1,000 men, including 225 knights.

Edmund meanwhile left England between 25th February and 4th March 1271. His route is mostly unknown, but we do know he travelled through France as Savoyard archives place him in Saint-Georges-d'Espéranche visiting his great-uncle Philip I, Count of Savoy. Thus making his departure port most likely Aigues-Mortes.

== Operations in the Holy Land ==
Edward arrived at Acre while it was still under siege. His arrival caused Baibars to change his plans and turn away from Acre. In the meantime, Edward discovered that the Venetians had a flourishing trade with the Mamluks, providing the latter with timber and metal needed for armaments. In addition, they controlled the slave-trade along with the Genoese, in which they carried Turkish and Tartar slaves from the Black Sea ports to Egypt. However, he could not prevent such businesses, as they had licenses from the High Court at Acre.

=== Crusader raids ===
The forces under Edward's command were much too small to take on the Mamluks in a straight battle, being unable to even stop the Mamluks from seizing the nearby Teutonic Montfort Castle. They settled for launching a series of raids, one of which reached Nazareth. The 14th-century English chronicler Walter of Guisborough mentions that Nazareth was captured, a detail not mentioned in sources from the Crusader states themselves. Another raid struck St Georges-de-Lebeyne but accomplished little other than burning some houses and crops, on top of losing a few men to the heat.

Later, the arrival of additional forces from England and Hugh III of Cyprus, under the command of Edward's younger brother Edmund, emboldened Edward. He launched a larger raid with the support of the Templar, Hospitaller, and Teutonic Knights at the Battle of Qaqûn. The Crusaders surprised a large force of Turcomans (mostly itinerant herdsmen), reportedly killing 1,500 of them and taking 5,000 animals as booty. These Turcomans were likely relatively new additions to Baibars' army, being integrated in 1268 and given horses, titles, and lands in return for military service after the Turkmen migrations following the Mongol invasions. Muslim sources list one emir as killed and one as wounded during this raid. On top of that, the Muslim commander of the castle was forced to abandon his command. However, Edward did not take the castle itself and retreated before Baibars could respond in kind (he was with his main army in Aleppo at the time, guarding against the Mongol raid).

In December 1271, Edward and his troops saw some action when they repelled an attack by Baibars on the city of Acre.

=== Mongol raids ===
As soon as Edward arrived in Acre, he made some attempts to form a Franco-Mongol alliance, sending an embassy to the Mongol ruler of Persia, Abagha, an enemy of the Muslims. The embassy was led by Reginald Rossel, Godefroi of Waus and John of Parker, and its mission was to obtain military support from the Mongols. In an answer dated 4 September 1271, Abagha agreed on cooperation and asked on what date the concerted attack on the Mamluks should take place.

At the end of October 1271, a Mongol army arrived in Syria. However Abagha, occupied by other conflicts in Turkestan could only send 10,000 horsemen under general Samagar, a force made up of the occupation army in Seljuk Anatolia and auxiliary Seljukid troops. Despite the relatively small force, their arrival still triggered an exodus of Muslim populations (who remembered the previous campaigns of Kitbuqa) as far south as Cairo. The Mongols defeated the Mamluk Turcoman troops that protected Aleppo, and raided southwards, sending the other garrisons fleeing for Hama, and devastating the lands down to Apamea. But the Mongols did not stay, and when the Mamluk leader Baibars mounted a counter-offensive from Egypt on 12 November the Mongols had already retreated beyond the Euphrates, laden with booty.

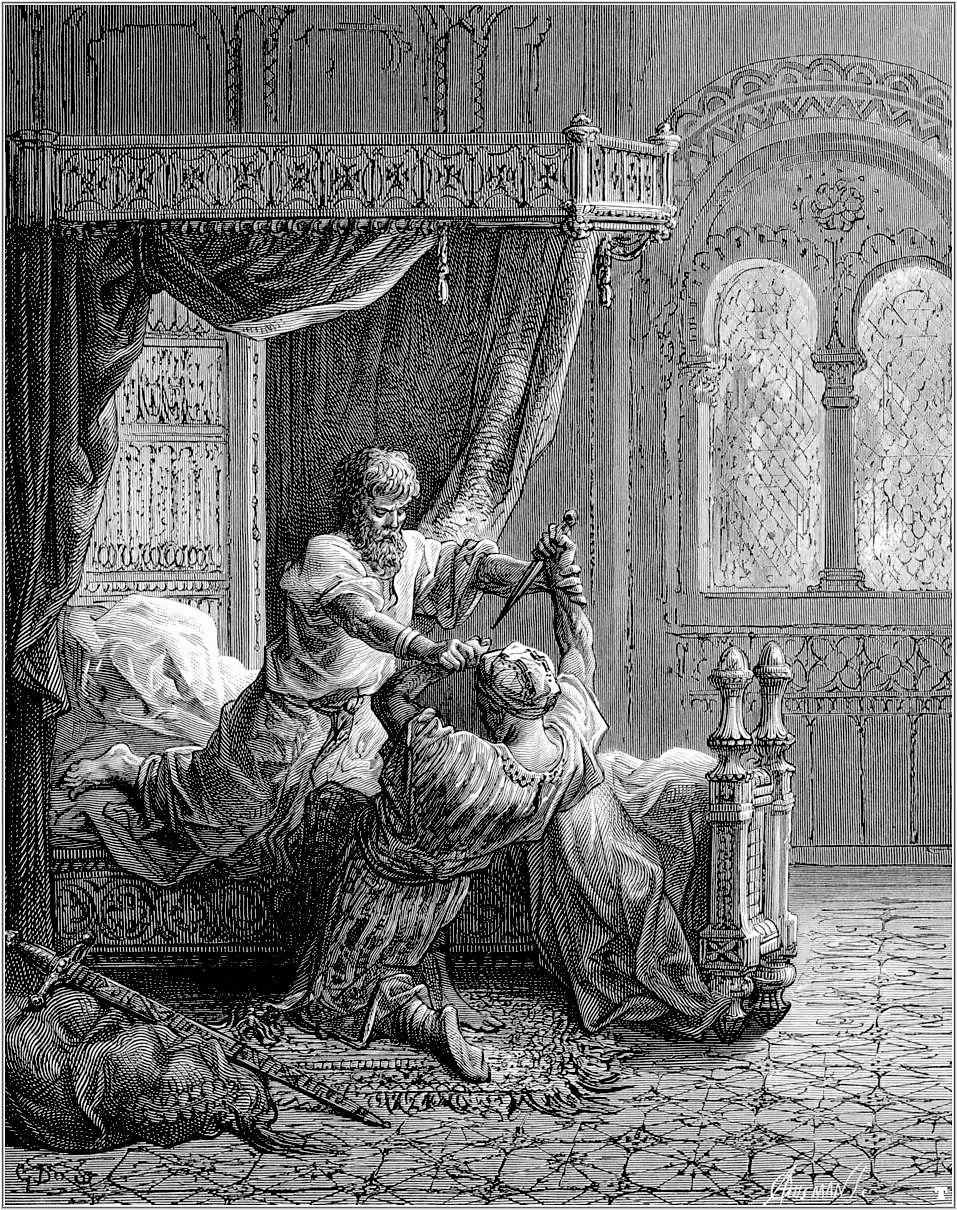
Edward I kills his attempted assassin. Engraving by Gustave Doré

=== Naval campaign off Cyprus ===
In the interim, Baibars came to suspect there would be a combined land-sea attack on Egypt. Feeling his position sufficiently threatened, he endeavoured to head off such a manoeuvre by building a fleet. Having finished construction of the fleet, rather than attack the Crusader army directly, Baibars attempted to land on Cyprus in 1271, hoping to draw Hugh III of Cyprus (the nominal king of Jerusalem) and his fleet out of Acre, with the objective of conquering the island and leaving Edward and the crusader army isolated in the Holy Land. He disguised 17 war galleys as Christian vessels and attacked Limassol. However, in the ensuing naval campaign the fleet was destroyed off the coast of Limassol and Baibars' armies were forced back.

=== End of the Crusade ===
Following this victory, Edward realized that to create a force capable of retaking Jerusalem it would be necessary to end the internal unrest within the Christian state, and so he mediated between Hugh and his unenthusiastic knights from the Ibelin family of Cyprus. In parallel to the mediation, Edward and Hugh began negotiating a truce with Baibars; a 10-year-10-month-and-10-day agreement was reached in May 1272, at Caesarea. Almost immediately Edmund departed for England, while Edward remained to see if the treaty would hold. The following month, an attempt to assassinate Edward was made, of uncertain origin. According to different versions, the assassin was sent by the emir of Ramlah or by Baibars. Some legends also say that the assassin was sent by the Hashshashin leader, the "Old Man of the Mountains". Edward killed the assassin but received a festering wound from a poisoned dagger, further delaying his departure. In September 1272, Edward departed Acre for Sicily and, while recuperating on the island, he first received news of the death of his son John, and then a few months later news of the death of his father, Henry III of England. In 1273 Edward started his homeward journey via Italy, Gascony and Paris. Edward finally reached England in the middle of 1274, and was crowned King of England on 19 August 1274.

== Aftermath ==
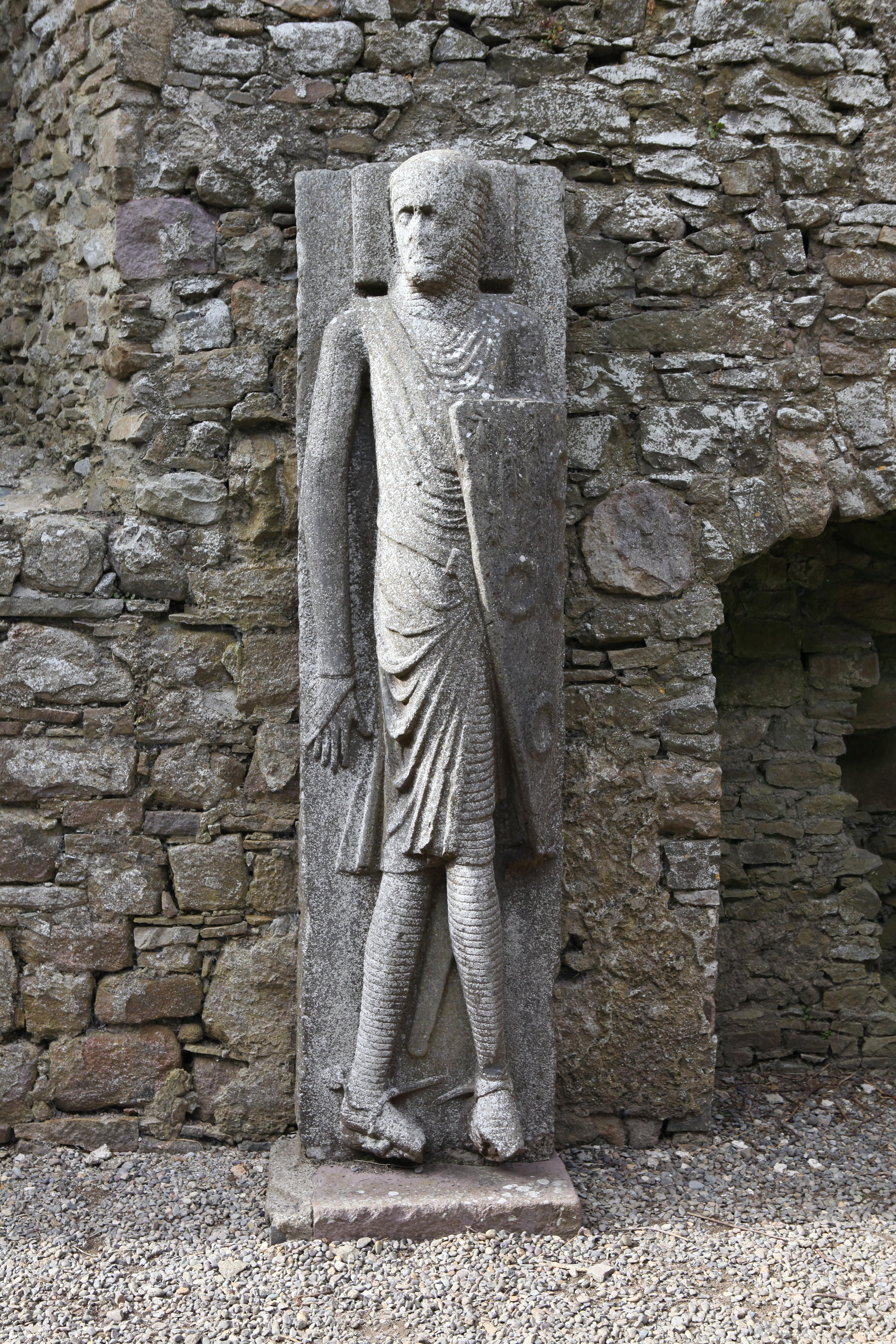
The Cantwell Fada, an Irish tomb effigy believed to depict a knight who fought in the Lord Edward's crusade

Edward had been accompanied by Theobald Visconti, who became Pope Gregory X in 1271. Gregory called for a new crusade at the Council of Lyons in 1274, but nothing came of this. Meanwhile, new fissures arose within the Christian states when Charles of Anjou took advantage of a dispute between Hugh III, the Knights Templar, and the Venetians to bring the remaining Christian state under his control. Having bought Mary of Antioch's claims to the Kingdom of Jerusalem, he attacked Hugh III, causing a civil war within the rump kingdom. In 1277, Roger of San Severino captured Acre for Charles.

Although the Crusaders' internecine war was debilitating, it offered the possibility of unified control of the crusade under Charles. However, this hope was dashed when Venice suggested a crusade be called not against the Mamluks but against Constantinople, where Michael VIII had recently re-established the Byzantine Empire and driven out the Venetians. Pope Gregory would not have supported such an attack, but in 1281 Pope Martin IV assented to it; the ensuing fiasco helped lead to the Sicilian Vespers on 31 March 1282, instigated by Michael VIII, and Charles was forced to return home. This was the last crusader expedition launched against the Byzantines in Europe or the Muslims in the Holy Land.

The remaining nine years saw an increase in demands from the Mamluks, including tribute, as well as increased persecution of pilgrims, all in contravention of the truce. In 1289, Sultan Qalawun gathered a large army and invested the remnants of the county of Tripoli. He ultimately laid siege to the capital and took it after a bloody assault. The attack on Tripoli however was particularly devastating to the Mamluks as the Christian resistance reached fanatical proportions and Qalawun lost his eldest and most able son in the campaign. He waited another two years to regather his strength.

In 1275, Abaqa sent a messenger to Edward with a letter. Abaqa requested that Edward mobilize for another Crusade, saying he could offer more help this time. Edward wrote back the same year, thanking Abaqa for his help in the Ninth Crusade while also noting his affection for Christianity. He said he did not know when there would be another Crusade, but was eager to get back to the Holy Land, and would inform Abaqa if the Pope declared another. The letter was almost certainly a formality, as Edward made no preparations for another Crusade. In 1276, another envoy was sent to Edward with the same message, with an additional message of apology for not effectively intervening in 1271.

In 1291, a group of pilgrims from Acre came under attack and in retaliation killed nineteen Muslim merchants in a Syrian caravan. Qalawun demanded they pay an extraordinary amount in compensation. When no reply came, the Sultan used it as a pretext to besiege Acre and finish off the last independent Crusader state occupying the Holy Land. Qalawun died during the siege, leaving Khalil, the sole surviving member of his family, as Mamluk Sultan. With Acre seized, the Crusader States other than Cyprus ceased to exist. The center of power of the Crusaders was moved northwards to Tortosa and eventually offshore to Cyprus.

In 1299, a Mongol army led by Ghazan Khan led a series of successful raids against the Mamluks in an area northeast of Homs to as far south as Gaza. He finally withdrew from Syria in 1300. The Mongols and Armenian Kingdom of Cilicia led another campaign to recapture Syria, but were soon defeated by the Mamluks at the Battle of Shaqhab in 1303. The last remaining foothold on the Holy Land, Ruad Island, was lost by 1303. The period of the Crusades to the Holy Land was over, 208 years after the beginning of the First Crusade.

== See also ==
- Alexandrian Crusade
- Egyptian Armed Forces
- Egyptian Army
- Henry V, Count of Luxembourg, joined Edward of England on his crusade
- List of wars involving Egypt
- Military of ancient Egypt
