= Samagar =

13th century Mongol general serving the Il-Khan ruler Abaqa Khan

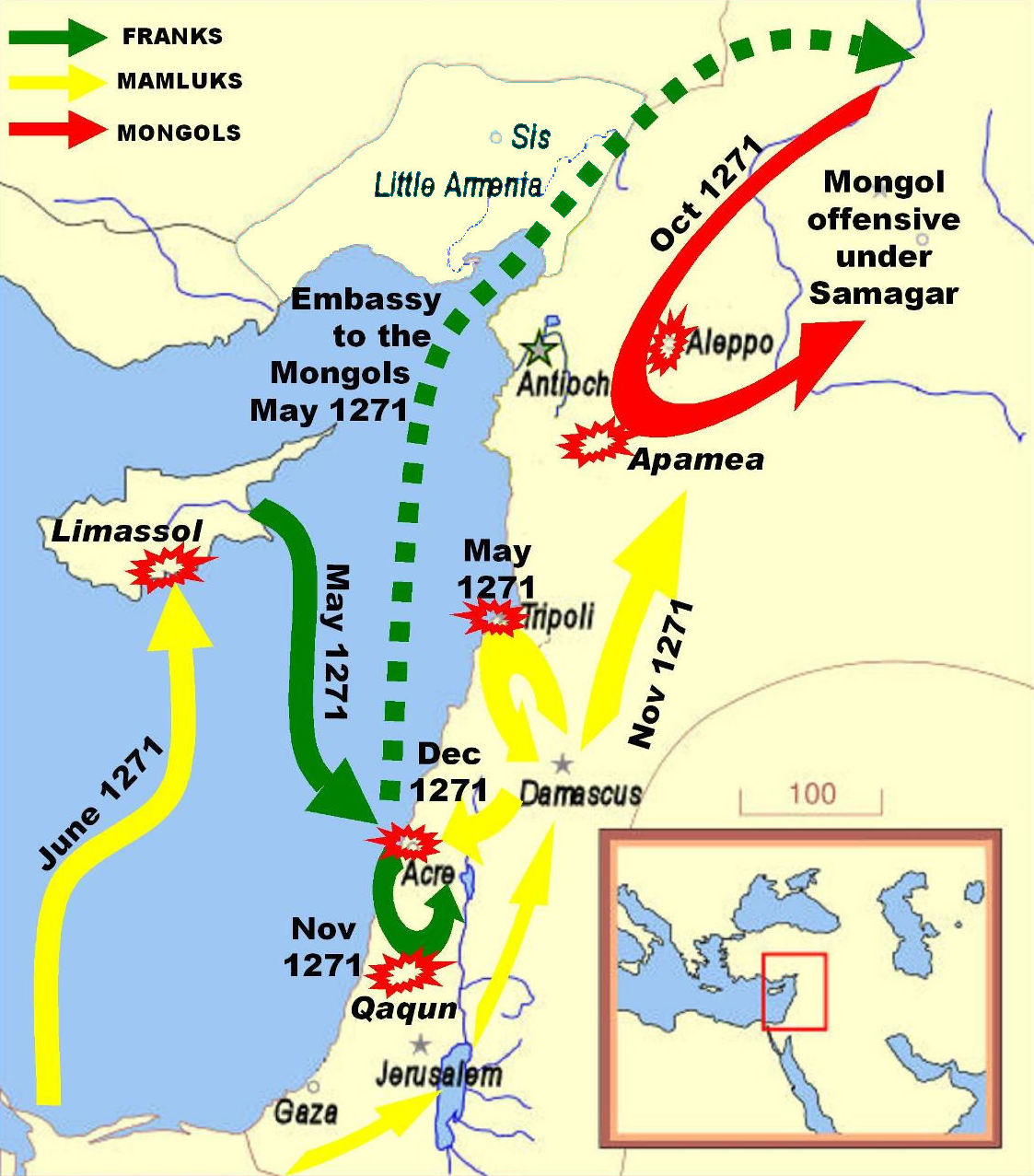
Troop movements of the Ninth Crusade. Samagar's forces (the red arrow) came in from the northeast and then retreated.

Samagar, also Cemakar, was a Mongol general of the Il-Khan ruler Abaqa Khan (1234–1282), mentioned as leading a Mongol invasion force in 1271, in attempted coordination with the Ninth Crusade.

== Background ==
Little is known about Samagar, but he is mentioned in the context of attempted collaborative operations of the Mongols and the Crusaders.

In 1269, the English Prince Edward (the future Edward I), had led a small force to the Holy Land as part of the Ninth Crusade. When he arrived in Acre on May 9, 1271, the situation in the Holy Land was particularly critical, as the Mamluk leader Baibars was besieging the Frankish noble Bohemond VI in the city of Tripoli.

== Samagar's campaign ==
As soon as Edward arrived in Acre, he immediately sent an embassy to the Mongol ruler Abaqa Khan, leader of the southwestern Ilkhanate. Edward's plan was to use the help of the Mongols to attack Baibars. Abaqa answered positively to Edward's request in a letter dated September 4, 1271:

"After talking over the matter, we have on our account resolved to send to your aid Cemakar (Samaghar) at the head of a mighty force; thus, when you discuss among yourselves the other plans involving the afore-mentioned Cemakar be sure to make explicit arrangements as to the exact month and day on which you will engage the enemy."

— Letter from Abaqa to Edward I, 1271.

In mid-October 1271, the Mongol troops under Samaghar arrived in Syria and ravaged the land from Aleppo southward. Abaqa, occupied by other conflicts in Turkestan, had only sent a minimal force of 10,000 Mongol horsemen under Samagar from the occupation army in Seljuk Anatolia, plus auxiliary Seljukid troops. However, the Mongol advance triggered an exodus of Muslim populations (who remembered the previous campaigns of Kitbuqa) as far south as Cairo. The Mongols defeated the Turcoman troops that protected Aleppo, putting to flight the Mamluk garrison in that city, and continued their advance to Maarat an-Numan and Apamea.

The Mongols stayed only briefly, and never combined forces with Edward. When Baibars mounted a counter-offensive from Egypt on November 12, 1271, the Mongols under Samagar had already retreated beyond the Euphrates With the Loot, unable to face the full Mamluk army. Edward returned to England in September, 1272.

Samagar later expressed his willingness to the Mamluk Sultan Qalawun that he could help him negotiate terms with Abaqa.

== Coup ==
According to Marco Polo, Samagar was one of Mongol nobles who assisted Arghun's escape from the captivity of Ahmed Tekuder. Buqa noyan persuaded him and others to help Arghun. Tekuder was defeated by Arghun's army, and eventually executed on August 10, 1284.
