= John Andrew Boyle =

British historian

John Andrew Boyle (10 March 1916 – 19 November 1978) was a British historian, accomplished linguist, and Oriental scholar.

== Life and career ==
John was born at Worcester Park, Surrey, England, on 10 March 1916. His father, Andrew Boyle edited and translated various works, including Spinoza's Ethics.

In 1933, John won a scholarship to Birmingham University where he graduated with first-class honours in German in 1936. He later pursued the studies of Oriental languages at the Universities of Berlin and Göttingen.

In 1941, he became a sapper (a soldier who performs a variety of military engineering duties). In 1942, he was assigned to the Foreign Office where he remained until 1950.

In 1945 he married Margaret Elizabeth Dunbar. They had three daughters together.

He completed his doctoral dissertation under the guidance of Vladimir Minorsky and went on to receive his doctorate in 1947.

He later became a professor of Persian at Manchester University. During this time, he produced a Persian dictionary and a grammar book of modern Persian. Additionally, he worked on translating and editing histories of Iran. Because of his dedication to the Persian language, he was the only European ever to receive the Iranian order of Sepas.

He died of heart failure on November 19, 1978, at the age of 62.

== Bibliography ==
Boyle was the author, translator, or editor of the following works:

=== Books ===
- Boyle, John Andrew (1949). A Practical Dictionary of the Persian Language. London: Luzac and Company. ISBN 9780875570570. Persian words are romanized in this dictionary.
- 'Ala-ad-Din 'Ata-Malik Juvaini (1958). Boyle, John Andrew (ed.). Tarikh-i Jahangushay [The History of the World-Conqueror]. Translated by John Andrew Boyle. Harvard University Press. ISBN 0674404009. Juvaini stopped working on the original Persian-language text in 1260, leaving it in a disorganized and incomplete state. Mirza Muhammad Qazvini completed the best text and published it in 1937. The 1958 edition (Boyle's English translation) is in two volumes. A book review of the 1958 edition was published by The American Historical Review. A revised edition of the Boyle translation was published in 1997.
- Boyle, John Andrew (1966). Grammar of Modern Persian. Wiesbaden, Germany: Harrassowitz Verlag. ISBN 9783447006927. (Porta linguarum orientalium; N.S., 9). A review of this book was published in a journal in 1967.
- Rashīd al-Dīn Faḍlallāh (1971). The Successors of Genghis Khan (PDF). Translated by John Andrew Boyle. New York City: Columbia University Press. ISBN 0231033516. Foreword by Ehsan Yarshater; Preface by John Andrew Boyle. This is a translation of Volume 2 of Rashīd's Jami' al-Tawarikh ("Compendium of Chronicles").
- Farīd al-Dīn ʻAṭṭār (1976). The 'Ilāhī-nāma [Book of God]. UNESCO collection of representative works: Persian heritage series; [no. 29]. Translated by John Andrew Boyle. Manchester, England: Manchester University Press. ISBN 0719006635. Foreword by Annemarie Schimmel. The 'Ilāhī-nāma is a 12th century Persian poem. An incompletely edited version is publicly accessible, here:
- Boyle, John Andrew (1977). The Mongol world empire, 1206-1370 (snippet view). Volume 58 of Variorum reprints (illustrated, reprint ed.). London: Variorum Collected Studies. ISBN 9780860780021. OCLC 03891719. Preface by Owen Lattimore.

=== Journal articles ===
- Boyle, John Andrew (1952). "Ibn Al-Tiqtaqa and the Ta'rikh-I-Jahan-Gushay of Juvayni". Bulletin of the School of Oriental & African Studies. 15. Cambridge University Press: 175–77. doi:10.1017/S0041977X00084263.
- Boyle, John Andrew (December 1954). "Iru and Maru in The Secret History of The Mongols". Harvard Journal of Asiatic Studies. 17 (3/4). Harvard–Yenching Institute: 403–410. doi:10.2307/2718320. JSTOR 2718320. Attempts to identify two city names that crop up in the description of Chingis’ Western campaigns. Webpage shows first page preview.
- Barthold, Wilhelm; Boyle, John Andrew (eds.). "D̲j̲uwaynī". Encyclopaedia of Islam Second Edition Online (EI-2 English) (2nd ed.). Leiden, Netherlands: Brill Publishers. D̲j̲uwaynī was a Persian bureaucrat and historian. "Ata-Malik Juvayni" is the spelling of D̲j̲uwaynī's name used in the title of his English Wikipedia article.
- Boyle, John Andrew (June 1956). "On the Titles Given in Juvaini to Certain Mongolian Princes" (PDF). Harvard Journal of Asiatic Studies. 19 (1/2). Harvard–Yenching Institute: 146–154. doi:10.2307/2718493. JSTOR 2718493.
- Boyle, John Andrew (May 1959). "The Mongols and Europe". History Today. 9 (5). London: 336–43. Webpage shows short preview.
- Boyle, John Andrew (Autumn 1961). "The Death of the Last 'Abbasid Caliph: A Contemporary Muslim Account". Journal of Semitic Studies. 6 (2): 145–161. doi:10.1093/jss/6.2.145. ISSN 0022-4480. Webpage shows first page preview.
- Boyle, John Andrew (Autumn 1963). "The Longer Introduction to the 'Zij-i-Ilkhani' of Nasir-ad-Din Tusi". Journal of Semitic Studies. 8 (2): 244–254. doi:10.1093/jss/8.2.244. ISSN 0022-4480. Webpage shows first page preview.
- Boyle, John Andrew (1975) [1968]. "Chapter 20(b): 'Umar Khayyam: Astronomer, Mathematician and Poet". In Frye, Richard Nelson (ed.). The Cambridge History of Iran. Vol. 4. pp. 658–664. ISBN 978-0-521-20093-6. Volume 4 is entitled "From the Arab invasion to the Saljuqs"; a PDF of volume 4 is available here:
- Boyle, John Andrew, ed. (1968). "Vol. 5: The Saljuq and Mongol periods". The Cambridge History of Iran (1st ed.). Cambridge, United Kingdom: Cambridge University Press. ISBN 052106936X. OCLC 457145670.
- Boyle, John Andrew (1970). "Rashīd al-Dīn and the Franks" (PDF). Central Asiatic Journal. 14 (1/3). Wiesbaden, Germany: Harrassowitz Verlag: 62–67. Webpage shows first page preview.
- Boyle, John Andrew (1970). "The significance of the Jami' al-Tawarikh as a source on Mongol history". Iran-Shinasi. 2 (1). Bethesda, Maryland: Keyan Foundation: 1–8. ISSN 1051-5364. OCLC 963373520. Makes some comparisons with the Yuan Shih (History of Yuan). An 8-page print book was created from this same Iran-Shinasi journal article, having the same author and title, and published by the Keyan Foundation in 1970.
- Boyle, John Andrew (1971). Sinor, Denis (ed.). "Ghazan's letter to Boniface VIII: where was it written?". Proceeding(s) of the Twenty-seventh International Congress of Orientalists, Ann Arbor, Michigan. Wiesbaden, Germany: Harrassowitz Verlag: 601–02. "Una lettera di Ghāzān Khan (anni di regno: 1295-1304), il mecenate di Rashīd al-Dīn, indirizzata a papa Bonifacio VIII (anni di pontificato: 1294-1303), datata 12 aprile 1302 e ora custodita nell’Archivio Segreto Vaticano, mostra gli stretti contatti tra l’Ilkhan e il Pontefice suo contemporaneo28." [A letter from Ghāzān Khan (reign: 1295-1304), the patron of Rashīd al-Dīn, addressed to Pope Boniface VIII (pontificate: 1294-1303), dated 12 April 1302 and now kept in the Vatican Secret Archives, shows the close contacts between the Ilkhan and his contemporary Pontiff. 28] (Quotation from "La strada per il Catai. Contatti tra Oriente e Occidente al tempo di Marco Polo" ISBN 8862507739, ISBN 9788862507738, Pages 213/216, Year 2019, Alvise Andreose, editor)
- Boyle, John Andrew (1971). "Marco Polo and His Description of the World". History Today. 21 (11): 759–69.
- Boyle, John Andrew (1971). "Rashīd al-Dīn: The First World Historian". Iran: Journal of the British Institute of Persian Studies. 9. Taylor & Francis: 19–26. doi:10.2307/4300435. ISSN 0578-6967. JSTOR 4300435. Webpage shows first page preview.
- Boyle, John Andrew (1974). "Some Thoughts on the Sources for the Il-Khanid Period of Persian History". Iran: Journal of the British Institute of Persian Studies. 12. Taylor & Francis: 185–88. ISSN 0578-6967.
- Boyle, John Andrew (1974). "The Alexander Legend in Central Asia". Folklore. 85 (4). London: The Folklore Society: 217–28. doi:10.1080/0015587X.1974.9716561.
- Boyle, John Andrew (1976). "The Il-Khans of Persia and the Princes of Europe". Central Asiatic Journal. 20 (1/2). Wiesbaden, Germany: Harrassowitz Verlag: 25–40. JSTOR 41927857. Webpage shows first page preview.
- Boyle, John Andrew (April 1979). "Alexander and the Mongols". The Journal of the Royal Asiatic Society of Great Britain and Ireland. 111 (2). Cambridge University Press: 123–136. doi:10.1017/S0035869X00135555. JSTOR 25211053.

- - - - - - - -

- Nasr, Seyyed Hossein, ed. (1977). "The Isma'ilis and the Mongol invasion". Isma'ili Contributions to Islamic Culture. Tehran: Imperial Iranian Academy of Philosophy.

- "Mongolia before Genghis Khan: the native tradition", Journal of the Anglo-Mongolian Society 2:1 (1975), 60-69.

- "The last barbarian invaders: the impact of the Mongol conquest upon East and West," Memoirs and Proceedings 112 (1969–70), 5-19.

- "The burial place of the Great Khan Ogedei," in 11th PIAC (1970), 45-50.

- "Sites and localities connected with the history of the Mongol empire," in Olon Ulsyn, v. 1 (1972), 75-79.

- "The seasonal residences of the Great Khan Ogedei, Central Asiatic Journal 16 (1972), 125-131. Also in 12th PIAC (1974), 145-151.

- "Kirakos of Ganjak on the Mongols", Central Asiatic Journal 8 (1963), 199-214

- "The summer and winter camping grounds of the Kereit", Central Asiatic Journal 17 (1973), 108-110.
