= Ingo Taleb Rashid =

Iraqi choreographer

- Born: Tareb Rashid
- Occupations: Dance artist, choreographer
- Career
- Current group: founder of El Haddawi

Ingo Taleb Rashid (born 2 May 1963), is Sheikh of the Tariqah Naqshbandi-Rashidiya, director, choreographer, and founder of El Haddawi.

== Life and work ==
He was born in Iraq, is head of the Naqshbandi-Rashidiya Sufi tradition and founder of Movement Concept. Movement Concept is a system of teaching and learning that is influenced by long years of studies in the following fields: Bujinkan Budo Tai Jutsu, classical Japanese Sword Fighting, judo, Feldenkrais Method, Capoeira, Stanislawski Method, Noh-Theatre, Modern Dance, stuntman training. He spent significant times in Japan studying martial arts and the local culture, and, since 1993, regularly works together with Kazuo Ohno (one of the founders of Japanese Butoh) and his son Yoshito.

He choreographed, amongst others of the musical "Peace Child", one of the first theatre productions in Israel in which Jewish and Arabic children were working together. His last bigger production "Danse Macabre", a mystery play about death and dying was inspired by the death paintings of the Spreuerbridge in Lucerne (Switzerland) and first brought to stage there.

Rashid regularly takes out performances, seminars and lectures in Europe, Asia and South America. He is producer of the International El Haddawi-Winterschool on Frauenchiemsee since 2001, of the Chiemgau-Dance-Theatre-Festival (since 2008) and seminar-travels.

== Productions (Dance-Theatre) ==
Warrior Soul: A journey through the soul of a warrior... Memories about honour, heroism and peace.

Performances:

- Cadaques, Spain; 1994
- Taschkent, Uzbekistan; 1997
- Munich (D), 1999/ Bad Endorf (D), 2000;
- Wasserburg (D), 2005;
- Mostar, Bosnia; 2006
- St.Petersburg, Russia, 2008;
- Kazan, Russia; 2011
- Rosenheim (D), 2012

Dervish Soul (based on "Conference of the Birds" and "Book of Suffering" by Fariduddin Attar)

- Würzburg (D), 2015

L'Amour Nomade: : Travel fragments, encounters and images in a nomadic world

Performances:

- Berlin, 1993;
- Bad Endorf, 2001;
- Wasserburg, 2004;
- Maria Luggau (A), 2014

Danse Macabre: A mystery play about death and dying

Performances:

- Lucerne (CH), 2002;
- Graz (A), 2002;
- Wasserburg (D) 2007
- Český Krumlov (CZ), 2016
- Wasserburg (D), 2016

Circles: A dance mandala based on the 99 names of God in the Sufi tradition

Performances:

- Baltimore, USA; 2004;
- Bad Endorf (D), 2008;
- Würzburg (D), 2009/10

Badehausträume: Fantasies rising from the steam in the Japanese bathhouse - "a ghostly dance of forgetting"

Performances:

- Munich (D), 1994 und 1996

Peace Child: A musical about a possible peace between Israelis and Palestinians

Performances:

- Tel Aviv, Israel; 1990
