= Conference of the Birds (Tunisian play) =

2020 play

The Conference of Birds (Arabic: منطق الطير) is a Tunisian theater play directed by Naoufel Azara and produced by the artistic space El Teatro in 2020. The text of the play is inspired by poems in the c. 1177 collection of the same name.

== Name ==
The piece is named after a collection of medieval poems by the Persian Sufi poet Farid al-Din Attar. Through these poems made of 4500 verses, he describes the adventure of thirty pilgrim birds led by a hoopoe that aims to find their supreme king, the Simurgh.

== Plot ==
Apart from its name, the director kept the same story as told in the collection. Of the 30 original birds, he only represented 5. During 90 minutes, he describes their adventure to find their king, the Simurgh. In this quest, they are forced to pass through seven valleys (valley of demand, love, knowledge, detachment, oneness of god, amazement and poverty). The hoopoe intervenes whenever one of the birds decides to give up to encourage it to continue. In the end, the birds reach their goal and meet their king, and it turns out that the latter is just a mirror that reflects their images and souls.

So through the original text and then this play, the poet and now the director want to expose the Sufi doctrine according to which God is not outside humans or the universe, but rather embodied in our souls and represents the essence of human existence.

The play is in classical Arabic, which only adds another Sufi mythical and religious breath. The choice of the hoopoe as leader of the troop also does so, since this animal was mentioned in the Quran in connection with the prophet Solomon.

According to certain interpretations, the director wants through his work to make reference to the Tunisian reality since January 14, 2011: a revolution that seeks to find its bearings and its identity in front of the political and ideological divide that the people live.

== Cast ==
- Naoufel Azara: La hoopoe
- Amel Aouini
- Thouraya Boughanmi
- Mourad Dridi
- Skander Brahem
- Sofien Bouajila
