= Annemarie Schimmel =

German scholar of Islam (1922–2003)

Annemarie Schimmel SI HI TCLN
- Born: 7 April 1922; Erfurt, Germany
- Died: 26 January 2003 (aged 80); Bonn, Germany
- Occupations: Iranologist; Sindhologist; Orientalist; Islamicist; university professor

Academic background
- Education: University of Berlin (doctorate); Marburg University (doctorate)

Academic work
- Discipline: Islamicist; linguist
- Sub-discipline: Sufism studies; Iqbal studies
- Institutions: Marburg University; Ankara University; Harvard University

Annemarie Schimmel SI HI TCLN (7 April 1922 – 26 January 2003) was an influential German scholar of Islamic studies who wrote extensively on Islam, especially Sufism. She was a professor at Harvard University from 1967 to 1992.

== Early life and education ==
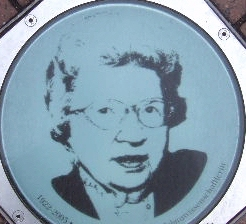
Glass plate in the Bonngasse, Bonn, Germany

Schimmel was born to Protestant and highly cultured middle-class parents in Erfurt, Germany. Her father Paul was a postal worker and her mother Anna belonged to a family with connections to seafaring and international trade. Schimmel remembered her father as "a wonderful playmate, full of fun," and she recalled that her mother made her feel that she was the child of her dreams. She also remembered her childhood home as being full of poetry and literature, though her family was not an academic one.

Having finished high school at age 15, she worked voluntarily for half a year in the Reich Labour Service. She then began studying at the University of Berlin in 1939, at the age of 17, during the Third Reich (1933–1945). At the university, she was deeply influenced by her teacher Hans Heinrich Schaeder, who suggested that she study the Divan-i Shams-i Tabrizi, one of the major works of Rumi. In November 1941, she received a doctorate with the thesis Die Stellung des Kalifen und der Qadis im spätmittelalterlichen Ägypten (The Position of the Caliph and the Qadi in Late Medieval Egypt). She was only 19 years old at the time, and her thesis was awarded magna cum laude. Not long after, she was drafted by the Federal Foreign Office, where she worked as a translator for the next few years while continuing her scholarly studies in her free time. On April 1, 1945, she submitted her Habilitation.

After the end of the Second World War in Europe, in May 1945, she was detained for several months by U.S. authorities for investigation of her activities as a German foreign service worker, but she was eventually released. In 1946, at the age of 23, she became a professor of Arabic and Islamic studies at Marburg University. She was married briefly in the 1950s, but domestic life did not suit her, and she soon returned to her scholarly studies. She earned a second doctorate at Marburg in the history of religion in 1954.

== Later life and scholarly career ==
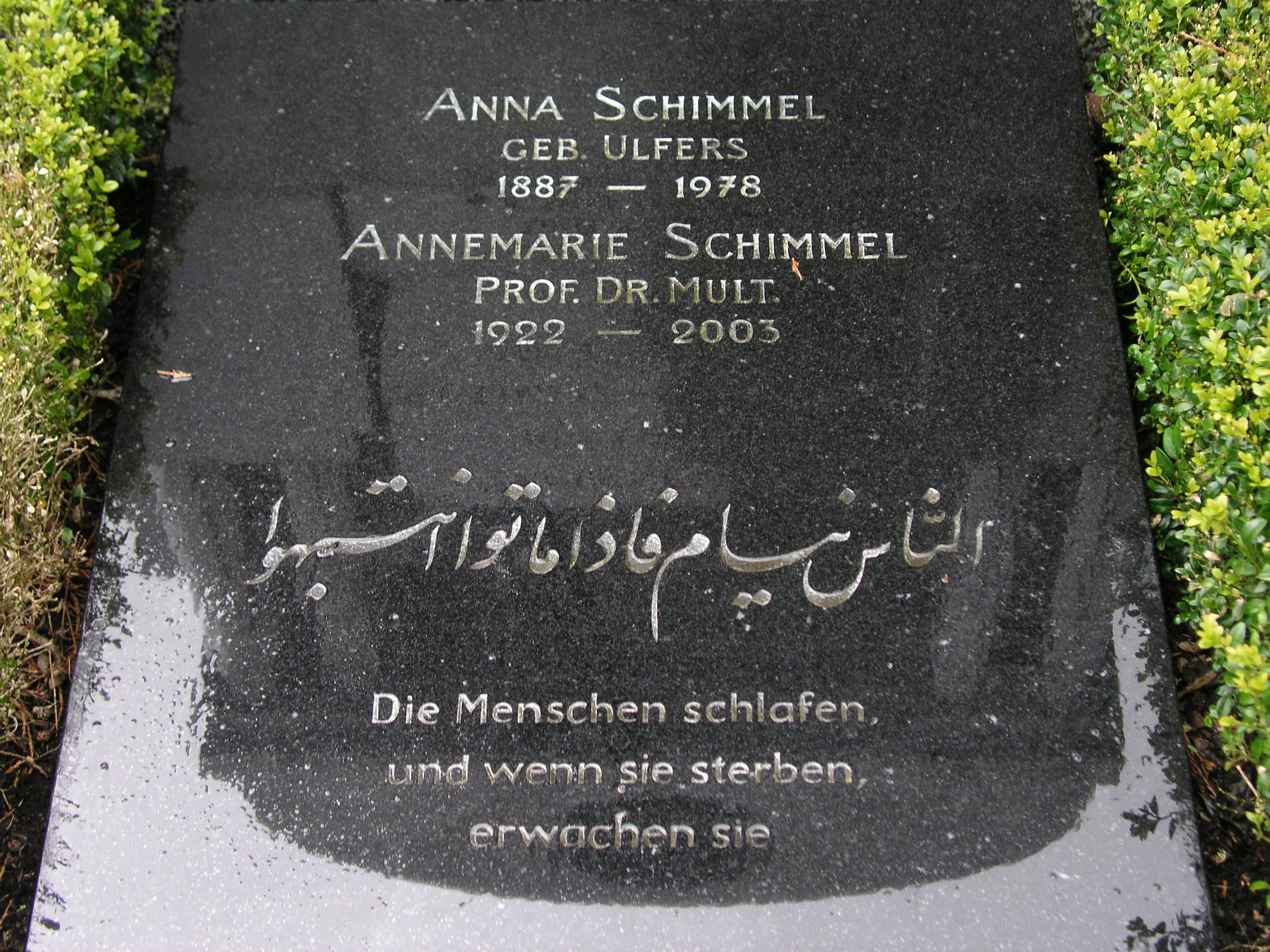
The grave of Annemarie Schimmel and her mother, with a quotation from Alī ibn Abī Ṭālib: "People are asleep. When they die, they wake up."

=== In Turkey (Ankara University, 1954–1967) ===
A turning point in Schimmel's life came in 1954 when she was appointed professor of the history of religion at Ankara University. She spent five years in the capital city of Turkey teaching in Turkish and immersing herself in the culture and mystical tradition of the country. She was the first woman and the first non-Muslim to teach theology at the university.

=== Harvard University (1967–1992) ===
In 1967 she inaugurated the Indo-Muslim studies program at Harvard University and remained on the faculty there for the next twenty-five years. While living in quarters on the Harvard campus, Schimmel often visited New York City, where, as a consultant at the Metropolitan Museum of Art, she was famed for her ability to date manuscripts and objects from the style of calligraphy in or on them. Her memory of calligraphic styles was almost photographic.

During the 1980s, she served on the editorial board of the Encyclopedia of Religion, published in 16 volumes (Macmillan, 1988) under the aegis of Mircea Eliade.

In 1992, upon her retirement from Harvard, she was named professor emerita of Indo-Muslim Culture. During this period, she was also an honorary professor at the University of Bonn.

=== Back in Germany (1992–2003) ===
After leaving Harvard, she returned to Germany, where she lived in Bonn until her death in 2003.

=== Religion ===
She was often asked by both Muslims and non-Muslims whether she was a Muslim. In such cases, she preferred to give an evasive answer, saying, for example, that only those who are not sure whether they are good Muslims or not can really be good Muslims.

=== Languages, interests and expertise ===
She was multilingual—besides German, English, and Turkish, she spoke Arabic, Persian, Urdu, and Punjabi—and her interests ranged across the Muslim landscape. She published more than fifty books and hundreds of articles on Islamic literature, mysticism, and culture, and she translated Persian, Urdu, Arabic, Sindhi, and Turkish poetry and literature into English and German. Her particular fondness for cats led her to write a book about their role in Islamic literature, and her interest in mysticism resulted in a book about numerical symbolism in various cultures. Her consuming passion, however, was Sufism, the mystical branch of Islam.

Schimmel was the cofounder of Fikrun wa Fann, a multilingual cultural magazine.

== Awards and honors ==
For her works on Islam, Sufism, and Muhammad Iqbal, a prominent philosopher and national poet of Pakistan, the government of Pakistan honored Schimmel with its highest civil awards,

- Sitara-e-Imtiaz, or Star of Excellence, by Government of Pakistan
- Hilal-e-Imtiaz, or Crescent of Excellence, by Government of Pakistan

She was given other awards from many countries of the world, including the 1995 prestigious Peace Prize of the German Book Trade. This award caused a controversy in Germany, as she had defended the outrage of the Islamic world against Salman Rushdie, author of The Satanic Verses (1988), in a television interview. Schimmel's award speech is available online in translation, entitled "A Good Word Is Like a Good Tree."

Among other awards and honors are the following:

- 1965 Friedrich Rückert Prize of the City of Schweinfurt, Germany
- 1978 Foreign member of the Royal Netherlands Academy of Arts and Sciences
- 1980 Johann Heinrich Voss Prize for Translation from the German Academy for Language and Literature
- 1989 Grand Order of Merit of the Federal Republic of Germany
- 1990 Golden Owl award of the German Socratic Society, for outstanding scholarship
- 1992 Dr. Leopold Lucas Prize of the University of Tübingen
- 25 October 1996, Order of Merit of the Republic of Turkey
- 1996 Egyptian Order of Merit for Art and Science, First Class
- 1997 Honorary membership in the Central Council of Muslims in Germany
- 2001 Reuchlin Prize of the City of Pforzheim, Germany, for outstanding contributions in the humanities
- 2002 Do'stlik Order of the Republic of Uzbekistan, for the promotion of friendship and mutual understanding between nations
- 2002 Muhammad Nafi Tschelebi Peace Prize of the Central Islamic Archive Institute of Germany, Soest, a prestigious award for Jewish-Christian-Muslim dialogue
- 2005 Name engraved in the "Walk of Fame" street in the City of Bonn

Schimmel also received honorary degrees from three Pakistani universities (Sindh, Quaid-i-Azam, and Peshawar), from the Faculty of Theology at Uppsala University, Sweden (1986), and from Selçuk University in Turkey.

== Selected works ==
- Mohammad Iqbal, Poet and Philosopher: A Collection of Translations, Essays, and Other Articles. Karachi: Pakistan-German Forum, 1960.
- Islamic Calligraphy. Evanston, Ill.: Adler's Foreign Books, 1970.
- Islamic Literatures of India. Wiesbaden: Otto Harrassowitz Verlag, 1973. ISBN 3-447-01509-8.
- Mystical Dimensions of Islam (512 pages). Chapel Hill: University of North Carolina Press, 1975. ISBN 0-8078-1271-4.
- Classical Urdu Literature: From the Beginning to Iqbal. A History of Indian Literature, v. 8. Wiesbaden: Otto Harrassowitz Verlag, 1975. ISBN 3-447-01671-X.
- Pain and Grace: A Study of Two Mystical Writers of Eighteenth-Century Muslim India. Leiden: Brill, 1976. ISBN 90-04-04771-9.
- Farīd al-Dīn ʻAṭṭār (1976). The 'Ilāhī-nāma [Book of God]. UNESCO collection of representative works: Persian heritage series; [no. 29]. Translated by John Andrew Boyle. Manchester, England: Manchester University Press. ISBN 0719006635. Foreword by Annemarie Schimmel. The 'Ilāhī-nāma is a 12th-century Persian poem.
- A Dance of Sparks: Imagery of Fire in Ghalib's Poetry. New Delhi: Ghalib Academy, 1979.
- We Believe in One God: The Experience of God in Christianity and Islam, edited by Annemarie Schimmel and Abdoldjavad Falaturi; translated by Gerald Blaczszak and Annemarie Schimmel. London: Burns & Oates, 1979.
- The Triumphal Sun: A Study of the Works of Jalaloddinn Rumi. London: East-West Publications, 1980.
- As Through a Veil: Mystical Poetry in Islam (376 pages). New York: Columbia University Press, 1982. ISBN 978-1-85168-274-4.
- Das Mysterium der Zahl (310 pages). Munich: Eugen Diederichs Verlag, 1983. English edition, The Mystery of Numbers (314 pages). New York: Oxford University Press, 1993. ISBN 0-19-508919-7.
- And Muhammad Is His Messenger: The Veneration of the Prophet in Islamic Piety (367 pages). Chapel Hill: University of North Carolina Press, 1985. ISBN 0-8078-4128-5.
- Gabriel's Wing: Study into the Religious Ideas of Sir Muhammad Iqbal. Karachi: Iqbal Academy, 1989. ISBN 969-416-012-X.
- Calligraphy and Islamic Culture. New York University Press, 1990. ISBN 0-8147-7896-8.
- Islamic Names: An Introduction (134 pages). Edinburgh University Press, 1990. ISBN 0-85224-612-9.
- Islam: An Introduction (166 pages). Albany: State University of New York Press, 1992. ISBN 0-7914-1327-6.
- A Two-Colored Brocade: The Imagery of Persian Poetry. Chapel Hill: University of North Carolina Press, 1992. ISBN 0-8078-2050-4.
- Deciphering the Signs of God: A Phenomenological Approach to Islam (314 pages). The 1991–1992 Gifford Lectures. Albany: State University of New York Press, 1994. ISBN 0-7914-1982-7.
- Nightingales under the Snow: Poems. London and New York : Khaniqahi Nimatullahi Publications, 1994. ISBN 0-933546-54-8.
- Anvari's Divan: A Pocket Book for Akbar. New York: Metropolitan Museum of Art, 1994.
- Introduction to Cats of Cairo: Egypt's Enduring Legacy, with photographs by Lorraine Chittock. New York: Abbeville Press, 1995. Reissued as Cairo Cats: Egypt's Enduring Legacy (96 pages). American University in Cairo Press, 2005. ISBN 977-17-2431-2.
- Meine Seele ist eine Frau. Munich: Kosel Verlag, 1995. English translation: My Soul Is a Woman: The Feminine in Islam (192 pages). New York and London: Continuum, 1997. ISBN 978-0-8264-1444-1.
- Look! This Is Love. Boston: Shambhala Centaur Editions, 1996. ISBN 1-57062-224-8.
- I Am Wind, You Are Fire: The Life and Work of Rumi. Boston: Shambhala Publications, 1997. Reissued as Rumi's World : The Life and Works of the Great Sufi Poet. Boston: Shambhala Publications, 2001. ISBN 0-87773-611-1.
- Im Reich der Grossmoguls: Geschichte, Kunst, Kultur. Munich: Verlag C.H. Beck, 2000. English translation: The Empire of the Great Mughals: History, Art, and Culture (352 pages). London: Reaktion Books, 2004. ISBN 1-86189-251-9.
- Make a Shield from Wisdom: Selected Verses from Nasir-I Khusraw's Divan (112 pages), translated and introduced by Annemarie Schimmel. London: I.B. Tauris, in association with the International Institute of Ismaili Studies, 2001. ISBN 1-86064-725-1.
- Islam and the Wonders of Creation: The Animal Kingdom. London: Al-Furqan Islamic Heritage Foundation 2003. ISBN 978-1-873992-81-4.

== See also ==
- Malamatiyya
- Iranology
- Famous Americans in Iran
