= Fikrun wa Fann =

Biannual cultural magazine in Germany (1963–2016)

- Former editors: Albert Theile; Annemarie Schimmel; Erdmute Heller; Stefan Weidner
- Categories: Cultural magazine
- Frequency: Biannual
- Circulation: c. 18.000
- Publisher: Goethe Institute
- Founder: Albert Theile; Annemarie Schimmel
- Founded: 1963
- Final issue Number: Autumn 2016; 105
- Country: Germany
- Based in: Munich
- Language: Arabic; German; Persian; English
- Website: Fikrun wa Fann
- ISSN: 0015-0932
- OCLC: 5167687

Fikrun wa Fann (Arabic: Thought and Art) was a biannual multilingual cultural magazine, focusing on cultural exchange between Germany and the Muslim world, published during its final fifteen years by the German cultural organization Goethe Institute. Founded in 1963 the last issue was published in autumn 2016.

== History and profile ==
Fikrun wa Fann was established in 1963. The founders were historian Albert Theile and Orientalist scholar Annemarie Schimmel. The magazine was owned and published first by the cultural organization Inter Nationes in Bonn, and later by the Goethe Institute in Munich. Fikrun wa Fann was originally started in Arabic and German, but later expanded to include editions in Persian and English languages.

Fikrun wa Fann featured articles about cultural relations between German society and Muslim societies. The goal was to contribute to the dialogue between these cultures through articles, photostories and editorials by German as well as authors from Islamic countries. In particular, it covered articles concerning the art, culture and socio-political issues related to German and Muslim societies.

From 1963 to 1982 (Nr. 37) the magazine was edited by its founders, Albert Theile and Annemarie Schimmel. They were replaced by Turkologist and journalist Erdmute Heller from issue no. 38. In 2001 Orientalist and literary critic Stefan Weidner became the editor-in-chief of the magazine. In 2016, the magazine's no 105, titled "Displacement", was its last issue. Many of the articles in four languages were available on the webpage of Fikrun wa Fann.
