= Movement Concept =

Movement Concept is a modern system of learning and teaching with traditional roots which imparts inner and outer movement in the broadest sense.

== Background ==
Movement Concept was created by Ingo Taleb Rashid and derives its fundamental principles from dance and theatre methods from East and West (e.g. Butoh, Noh, Stanislawski Method), martial arts (e.g. Ninpo, Capoeira) and the ancient tradition of Sufism, the spiritual principles of which are transferred into modern body work. The idea behind Movement Concept is to tap a person’s full potential, to use exhaustively the diversity of the body’s capacity for movement and expression, to make these accessible and use them for stage work and, at the same time, increases our awareness of it. An essential part of the system is “play”, in which two people apply the acquired technique and abilities in free improvisation inside a protective circle of participants.

== Three-year Ongoing Curricular Training ==
Movement Concept is intended as a practical educational training system combining bodywork, performing arts and spirituality. It is meant for all people who want to deal more deeply with these topics – regardless of age, experience or previous knowledge. It is also suitable as advanced training for performers in the areas of dance, directing and choreography. The Movement Concept curriculum spans three years (approx. 30 days of training each year). Before entering into training, a personal conversation with the educational director is required. The training concludes with a written assignment and a demonstration lesson. After successful completion of the curriculum, participants receive a diploma that certifies the qualification to teach Movement Concept under the supervision of El Haddawi.

== Some Topics ==
- Magic of the Body
- Dance, Improvisation and Choreography
- The Triangle of Intention
- The Dancing Warrior
- Living Anatomy, Health and Prevention of Injuries
- A Practical Introduction to the History of Dance
- Spirituality in Dance
- Stage-fright and Presence
- The Art of Flying and Falling
- Beyond the Masks – the Versatile Actor
