= Stefan Weidner =

German scholar of Middle Eastern cultures and translator

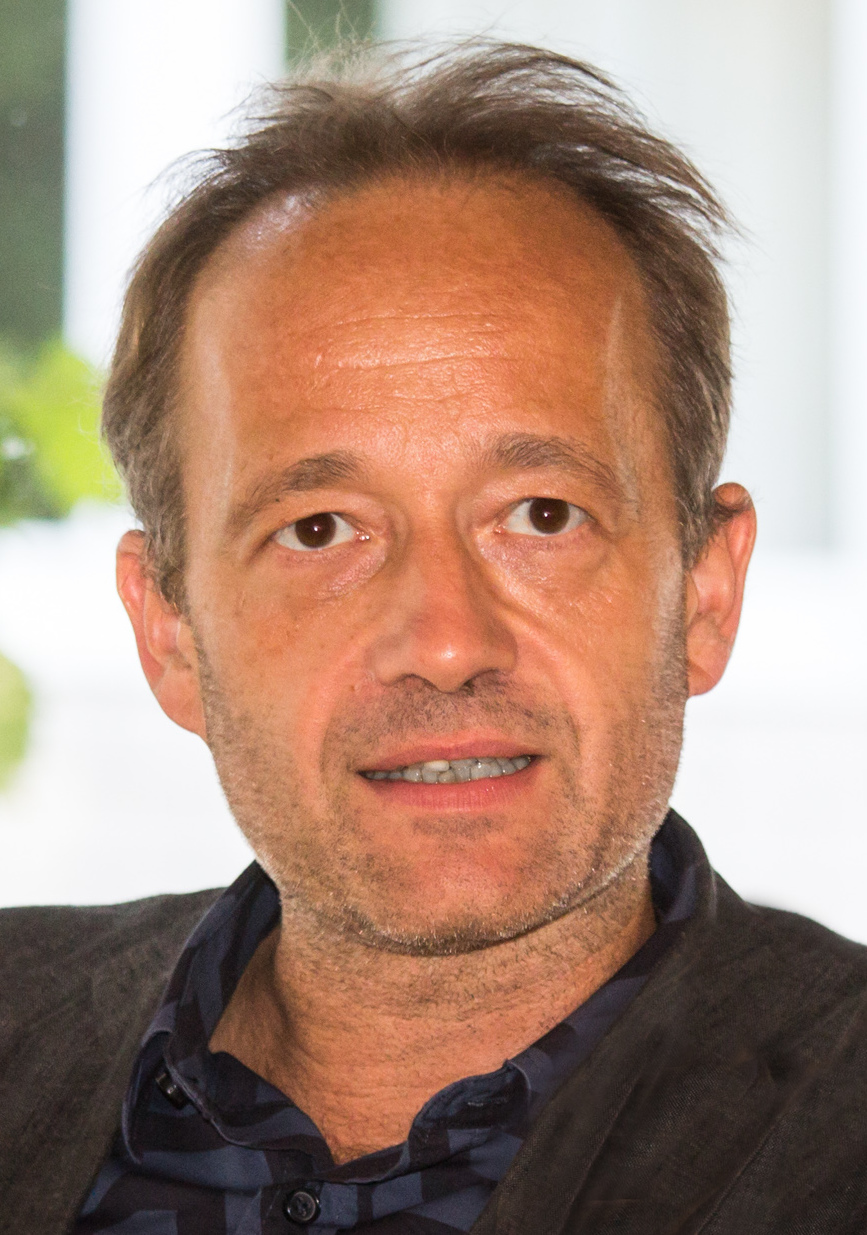
- Stefan Weidner in 2017
- Born: 1 October 1967 (age 58); Cologne, West Germany
- Education: Universities in Göttingen, Damascus, California, Berkeley, and Bonn
- Occupations: scholar of Islamic cultures, writer, translator
- Years active: 1990s–present
- Known for: Scholarship and translations of literature from the Islamic world
- Notable work: Translations of works by Adonis, Mahmud Darwish, Ibn Arabi, literary criticism

Stefan Weidner (born 1967) is a German scholar of Islamic cultures, writer and translator. He is mainly known for his literary criticism and German translations of Arabic, Persian, as well as other literatures of the Islamic world.

Weidner has been honoured with literary awards in Germany and the Sheikh Hamad Award for Translation and International Understanding in Qatar. Due to his contributions to the reception of Arabic and other Middle Eastern literatures, he has been described as a "leading mediator of Middle Eastern poetry and prose into German."

== Life and career ==
As a schoolboy Weidner first travelled to North Africa and had his first experience with a Muslim society. He later studied Modern Oriental studies, German studies and philosophy at universities in Göttingen, Damascus, California, Berkeley, and Bonn. Weidner is mainly known as author, translator, editor and literary critic of Arabic literature in Germany.

In October 2012, Weidner was a founding member of the Akademie der Künste der Welt in Cologne. He is a member of the German Academy for Language and Poetry and the writers' association PEN Centre Germany. He has written for the national German press, including the Süddeutsche Zeitung, Frankfurter Allgemeine Zeitung, Die Zeit, as well as for the online portal Qantara.de.

== Scholarship, translation and literary criticism ==
From 2001 until 2016, Weidner was editor-in-chief of the magazine Fikrun wa Fann, published by the Goethe-Institut as a contribution to the dialogue between Western and Islamic cultures. He has translated Arabic poetry, including works by Adonis, Mahmud Darwish, Ibn Arabi as well as the Mu'allaqât.

His non-fiction book 1001 Buch: Die Literaturen des Orients (English: The Literatures of the Orient) has been described as a scholarly "walk through the centuries of the literatures of the Orient". According to scholar Stefan Wild, Weidner is a "leading mediator of Middle Eastern poetry and prose into German." Further, Wild commented on the book as follows: "Now, with 1001 Buch, he [Weidner] has succeeded his greatest coup yet: an overall view of Arabic, Persian and Ottoman/Turkish literature from the seventh century to the present day."

== Publications ==
As author

- Erlesener Orient. Ein Führer durch die Literaturen der islamischen Welt. Edition Elene, Vienna 2004, ISBN 3-85266-239-7 (Literary criticism).
- Mohammedanische Versuchungen. Ein erzählter Essay. Ammann Verlag, Zürich 2004, ISBN 978-3-250-60074-9
- "…und sehnen uns nach einem neuen Gott…" Poesie und Religion im Werk von Adonis. Verlag Schiler, Berlin 2005, ISBN 3-89930-116-1.
- Allah heißt Gott. Eine Reise durch den Islam. Fischer, Frankfurt 2006 ISBN 3-596-85212-9
- Fes. Sieben Umkreisungen. Amann, Zurich 2006 ISBN 3-250-60095-4.
- Manual für den Kampf der Kulturen. Warum der Islam eine Herausforderung ist. Ein Versuch. Verlag der Weltreligionen, Frankfurt 2008 ISBN 978-3-458-71012-7
- Mohammedanische Versuchungen. Ein erzählter Essay. Neuausg. Suhrkamp, Frankfurt 2008, ISBN 978-3-518-45982-9
- Aufbruch in die Vernunft. Islamdebatten und islamische Welt zwischen 9/11 und den arabischen Revolutionen. Verlag J.H.W. Dietz Nachf., Bonn 2011 ISBN 978-3-8012-0417-4
- Das Morgenland des Gefühls braucht eine Neue Sachlichkeit. Essay, FAZ, 14 January 2013, p. 30
- Anti-Pegida: Eine Streitschrift. Create Space Independent Publishing, 2015 ISBN 978-1-5078-8303-7
- Fluchthelferin Poesie. Friedrich Rückert und der Orient. Wallstein, Göttingen 2017, ISBN 978-3-8353-1986-8
- Jenseits des Westens: Für ein neues kosmopolitisches Denken. Carl Hanser, Munich 2018, ISBN 978-3-446-25849-5.
- 1001 Buch: Die Literaturen des Orients, Edition Converso, Bad Herrenalb 2019, ISBN 978-3-9819-7633-5.
- Ground Zero: 9/11 und die Geburt der Gegenwart, Carl Hanser, Munich 2021, ISBN 978-3-446-26933-0.

As publisher

- Die Farbe der Ferne. Moderne arabische Lyrik. C.H. Beck, Munich 2000, ISBN 978-3-406-45860-6
- Kaffeeduft und Brandgeruch. Beirut erzählt. Ein Lesebuch. Suhrkamp, Frankfurt, 2002, ISBN 978-3-518-39866-1
- Adonis: Wortgesang. Von der Dichtung zur Revolution. S. Fischer, Frankfurt, 2012 ISBN 978-3-10-000630-1

As translator

- Ibn Arabi: Der Übersetzer der Sehnsüchte. Liebesgedichte aus dem arabischen Mittelalter. Jung und Jung, Salzburg 2016 ISBN 978-3-99027-082-0

== Awards and distinctions ==
- 2006: Clemens-Brentano-Preis
- 2007: Johann-Heinrich-Voß-Preis für Übersetzung
- 2008: H. C. Artmann-Stipendium
- 2011: Thomas-Kling-Poetikdozentur at Bonn University
- 2014: Paul Scheerbart-Preis for his translation of Adonis
- 2017: Member of the Deutsche Akademie für Sprache und Dichtung
- 2018: First Prize of the Sheikh Hamad Award for his translation of Ibn Arabi's Tarjumān al-Ashwāq (The Interpreter of Desires)
- 2020: Residence at Tarabya Cultural Academy, Istanbul
- 2026: Sheikh Zayed Book Award - Arab Culture in Other Languages category for his book Der arabische Diwan: Die schönsten Gedichte aus vorislamischer Zeit (The Arabic Diwan: The Most Beautiful Poems from the Pre-Islamic Era and Beyond).

== See also ==
- Quran translations, with Weidner's version of Surah 97
