= Sholeh Wolpé =

American poet, playwright and literary translator

- شعله ولپی
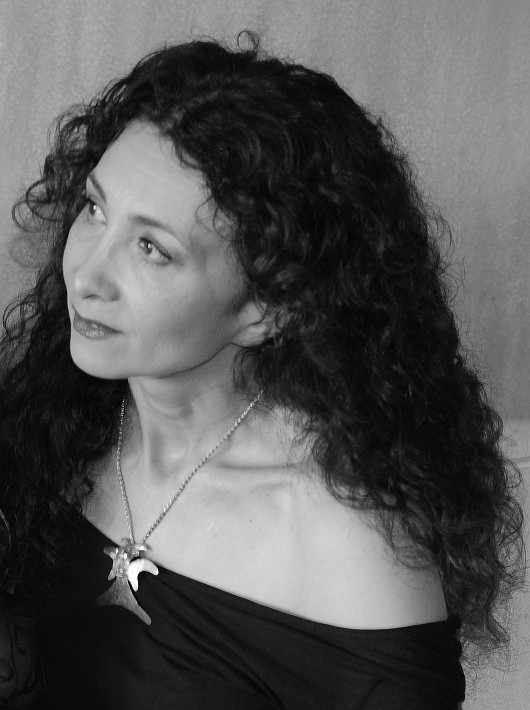
- Wolpé in 2013; photo by Jordan Elgrably
- Born: 1962 (age 63–64); Tehran, Iran
- Education: George Washington University, Northwestern University, Johns Hopkins University
- Occupations: Poet, author, playwright, librettist, editor, literary translator
- Website: www.sholehwolpe.com

Sholeh Wolpé (Persian: شعله ولپی; born 1962 in Tehran, Iran) is an Iranian and American award-winning poet, author, playwright, librettist, and literary translator. She was born in Iran, writes in English, and translates literature from Persian. Her literary work includes seven collections of poetry, several plays, five books of translations and three anthologies, as well as short stories and texts and librettos for the choir and opera. She is the Writer-In-Residence at the University of California, Irvine.

The Poetry Foundation has written that “Wolpé’s concise, unflinching, and often wry free verse explores violence, culture, and gender. So many of Wolpé’s poems deal with the violent situation in the Middle East, yet she is ready to bravely and playfully refuse to let death be too proud.”

About her new translations of Iranian Sufi mystic Attar, who Rumi considered a master, Literary Hub writes: "Sholeh Wolpé’s stunning new translation—the first in over 30 years—renders Attar’s engaging, singular voice with wit and flourish.”

Wolpe's translations of Iran's rebel poet Forugh Farrokhzad are considered the most accurate and musical. Her translations in Sin: Selected Poems of Forugh Farrokhzad was awarded the 2010 Lois Roth Persian Translation. In their citation the judges wrote: “In Wolpé’s fresh and vital translation, a musical and compelling English version that draws the reader along and captures a sense of the exquisitely balanced pacing of Farrokhzad’s language, and the immediacy and authenticity of her voice, the members of the Lois Roth jury found themselves experiencing Forugh’s Persian poems with new eyes."

== Biography ==
Sholeh Wolpé was born in 1962 in Tehran, Iran where she lived until age 13. She was then sent to Trinidad to live with her aunt and grandmother. She was later sent to a boarding school in Eastbourne, UK (Moira House School) where she completed her high school. She continued her higher education in the United States. She lived in Washington DC, Virginia, Chicago, Redlands, and Los Angeles. \

In 2018 Wolpé became the inaugural Writer-In-Residence at UCLA. Presently she lives with her husband, sociologist Edward Telles, in Barcelona and Irvine where she is the Writer-In-Residence at University of California, Irvine.

== Literary Work ==
-Attar- The Invisible Sun, Sholeh Wolpé, Harper Collins, August 2025

-Iran + 100, Stories from a Century After the Coup, story: "Tooth for a tooth" story by Sholeh Wolpe, Comma Press, 2025

-Ábaco de la Pérdida, poemas, Sholeh Wolpé, Visor Libros, Spain, June 2025

-Abacus of Loss—a memoir in verse, University of Arkansas Press, March 2022

-The Outsider, Poems, Recent Works Press, University of Canberra, Australia, 2018

-The Conference of the Birds, Attar, translated from Persian to English by Sholeh Wolpé. W. W. Norton & Co, March 2017

-Cómo Escribir una Canción de Amor, Poemas, Olifante Press, Spain, 2017

-Keeping Time with Blue Hyacinths, Poems, University of Arkansas Press, 2013.

-Breaking the Jaws of Silence—Sixty American Poets Speak to the World, edited by Sholeh Wolpé, University of Arkansas Press, 2013.

-The Forbidden: Poems from Iran and its Exiles, Sholeh Wolpé, editor and translator of most of the poems in the anthology, Michigan State University Press, 2012.

-Walt Whitman: Song of Myself, (Nashreh Naw, Iran), co-translated from English to Persian by Sholeh Wolpé and Mohsen Emadi, Commissioned by The International Writing Program at the University of Iowa, for Whitman Web Project: 2012-2013.

-Atlanta Review: 2010 Iran Issue, editor and translator of some of the poems, Atlanta Review, 2010.

-Tablet and Pen: Literary Landscape from the Modern Middle East, Sholeh Wolpé, regional editor and translator of selected pieces; edited by Reza Aslan, W.W. Norton & Company, 2010.

-Rooftops of Tehran, Poems, Red Hen Press, 2008.

-Sin: Selected Poems of Forugh Farrokhzad, edited and translated from Persian to English by Sholeh Wolpé, University of Arkansas Press, 2007.

-The Scar Saloon, Poems, Red Hen Press, 2004.

== Plays and Texts For Music ==
-Nava Avaz - A full-length opera for five composers. Commissioned for 2026 performance. Recipient of Opera America Discovery Award in 2025.

-New Voices – Longing I, Forugh Farrokhzad, composed by Charlotte Bray. Commissioned by Brooklyn Art Song Society Premiere: April 12, 2026

-THE SEVEN VALLEYS a multi-genre poetry/dance/music commissioned by The Getty Villa Museum in Los Angeles. I Will Greet the Sun Again – Songs for Soprano and Piano, Aug 1, 2025. Composed by Pouya Hamidi.

-THE CONFERENCE OF THE BIRDS a semi-staged oratorio, Composed by Fahad Siadat, Libretto by Sholeh Wolpé

-Song of Exile (Part I), composed by Sauder Choi, Text by Sholeh Wolpe, Commissioned by The Arlington Choir

-Song of Exile (part II), composed by Saunder Choi, Libretto, Sholeh Wolpé, Commissioned by New Voices, Wisconsin – Premiere Oct 26, 2024

-Language of Loss – Art Song composed by Aida Shirazi. Commissioned by Brooklyn Art Song Society – Premiere May 2, 2024, NYC

-THE CONFERENCE OF THE BIRDS a play by Sholeh Wolpé

-LET ME IN, A play for high school and middle school, published and distributed by Theaterfolk

-HOLY CORONA, a short play by Sholeh Wolpe, The Alternative Theater Company, 2020

-BROTHERS AT THE CANADIAN BORDER, a short play by Sholeh Wolpe, Town Street Theater, 11th Ten Minute Play Festival, April 4–26, 2020, Stella Adler Theater, Los Angeles

-“And Here I am, A Lonely Woman.” Composed by Huba de Graaf. For their music theater production The Netherlands. Text, Wolpe/Farrokhzad Tour: Jan 24 – May 31, 2022

-Language of Loss. Composed by Aida Shirazi. Lyrics, Sholeh Wolpé Commissioned by Scripps College for RISE festival, April 2021

-Journey to Now-Ruz. 50 min. Video. Script, creative content and translations, Sholeh Wolpé; Music and tar performance, Sahba Motallebi. Commissioned by the University of Toronto March 26, 2021

-The Window, Composed by Niloufar Nourbakhsh. Lyrics: Translation of Forugh Farrokhzad poem by Sholeh Wolpé, Refugee Orchestra Project, 2020

-We the Innumerable, Composed by Niloufar Nourbakhsh, award Opera America Discovery grant, 2020. The work includes Sholeh Wolpé ’s translations of Forugh Farrokhzad

-The Wind Will Blow Us Away, composed by Sahba Aminikia.

-Paradise, for a cappella choir, composed by Shawn Crouch for poems by Brian Turner, and by Hafez, selected, reinterpreted and translated by Sholeh Wolpé. Volti, Innova Recordings, St. Paul, MN, 2015.

-Effervescence, original lyrics by Sholeh Wolpé for Grammy nominated San Gabriel 7’s third jazz album, Lost My Heart, February 2012.

-From Green To Green, poem by Sohrab Sepehri, selected and translated by Sholeh Wolpé for album: A Window To Color, Mamak Khadem. Album release date, July 2011.

== Awards and Fellowships ==
- PEN Award for Poetry in Translations, long list, 2026
- S&P Best Spiritual Book Award, 2026
- Opera American Discovery Grant, 2025
- O'Brien Distinguished Visiting Professor, Scripps College, 2022
- “Cultural Trailblazer,” City of LA, Department of Cultural Affairs 2020
- Inaugural Writer-in-Residence, UCLA 2018
- International Poetry Translation Fellowship, Spain 2015
- PEN/Heim Translation Fund Grant 2014
- Midwest Book Award 2013
- Lois Roth Persian Translation Award 2010
- Artists Embassy International, “Peace through the Arts” award, 2005
- The National League of American Pen Women award, 2003
- Houston Poetry Fest, Juried Poet Award, 2003
