= Ilāhī-Nāma =

12th century Persian poem by Farid ud-Din Attar

The Ilāhī-Nāma (Persian: الهی‌نامه, "Book of God" or "Book of the Divine") is a 12th century Persian poem by the Sufi apothecary-poet Farid ud-Din Attar (c. 1145–1221). It is made of roughly 6500 verses and features anecdotal stories varying greatly in length, with some only 3 verses long and others around 400 verses long. Attar endeavored to open the "door to the divine treasure" with this poem and he believed that the final work has praised Muhammad in a manner beyond any poet before or after himself.

== Background ==
Work on the poem began around the same time as his Moṣībat-nāma, all while Attar worked in a popular pharmacy in Nishapur, Greater Khorasan, during the age of the Seljuk Empire. During his time as an apothecary and physician, Attar remained busy with and affected by the ailments of his customers and his Ilāhī-Nama reflects what he learned during his time at the pharmacy. Attar spent his later years in Nishapur, where he remained comfortably retired until he was violently executed as part of a massacre during the Mongol invasion of 1221.

== Contents ==
The frame-story tells of a caliph who asks his six princes of their heart's desire. Each of them responds with temporal wants, including the daughter of the king of the fairies, the Jām-e jam, and the ring of Solomon. So the incredulous ruler tries to explain the absurdity of each desire before using spiritual stories to illuminate the deeper interpretation of each of the princes' wants; examples include how the princess represents the prince's own purified soul, the cup of Jamshid is the moment when state of union with god turns into the mirror of reality, and the ring of Solomon is to be content with what one already has. The overall theme of the piece is that whatever one seeks is ultimately within oneself.

Beyond the metaphysics of Sufism, the poem also exhibits Attar's secular knowledge as a man of medicine as he brings up an anecdote of a polymath's deft talent in removing a brain tumor. Aligned with his proficiency as an apothecary, Attar uses alchemy to mean the transformation of the body into heart and of the heart into pain. The text also contains high praise for the Prophet through Sufi-style mystical poetry, as Attar writes:

Muhammad is the exemplar to both worlds, the guide of the descendants of Adam.
He is the sun of creation, the moon of the celestial spheres, the all-seeing eye. [...]
The seven heavens and the eight gardens of paradise were created for him,
He is both the eye and the light in the light of our eyes.

== See also ==
- Sufism
- The Conference of the Birds
