= Central Asiatic Journal =

- Discipline: Central Asia
- Language: Chinese, English, French, German, Russian
- Edited by: Lars Peter Laamann

Publication details
- History: 1955-present
- Publisher: Harrassowitz Verlag
- Frequency: Biannual

Standard abbreviations
- ISO 4: Cent. Asiat. J.

Indexing
- CODEN: CAJOFE
- ISSN: 0008-9192
- LCCN: 57024650
- OCLC no.: 1553665

Links
- Journal homepage

Central Asiatic Journal is a biannual peer-reviewed academic journal covering research on the languages, history, archaeology, religious and textual traditions of Central Asia.

== Abstracting and indexing ==
The journal is abstracted and indexed in the Arts and Humanities Citation Index and Current Contents/Arts & Humanities.
