= The Conference of the Birds =

Persian poem by Sufi poet Attar

- by Attar of Nishapur
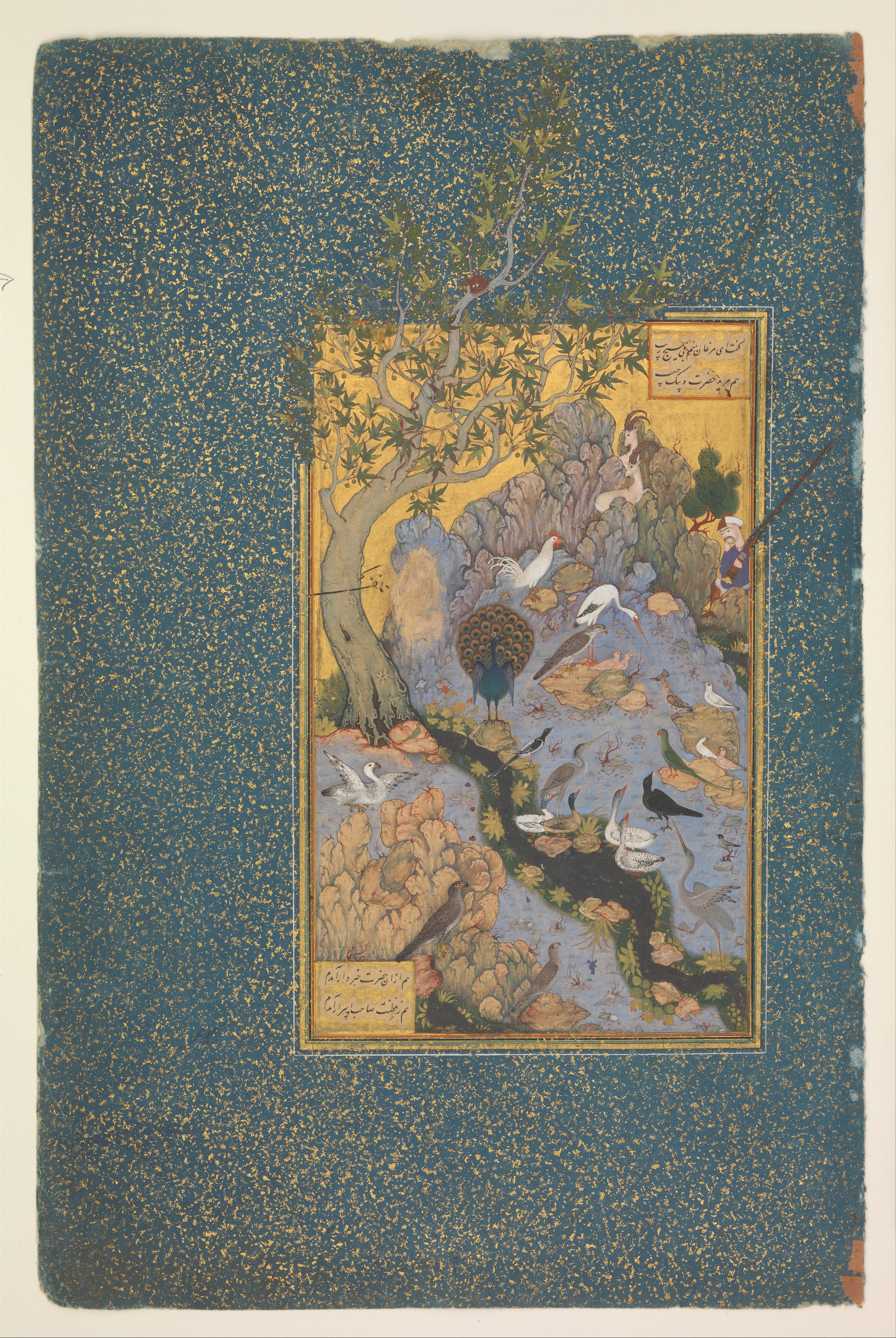
- Scene from The Conference of the Birds in a Persian miniature. The hoopoe, center right, instructs the other birds on the Sufi path.
- Original title: مقامات الطيور
- Written: c. 1177 CE
- Country: Iran
- Language: Classical Persian
- Subject(s): Persian mythology, Sufism

The Conference of the Birds or Speech of the Birds (Arabic: منطق الطير, Manṭiq-uṭ-Ṭayr, also known as مقامات الطیور Maqāmāt-uṭ-Ṭuyūr; 1177) is a Persian poem, in the mathnawi form, by Iranian Sufi poet Farid ud-Din Attar, commonly known as Attar of Nishapur. The poem follows a group of birds on a spiritual journey in search of their Shah, the Simurgh, and explores themes of self-discovery, love, spiritual transformation, and the search for divine truth. The work became an influential text in Persian Sufi literature and has continued to inspire writers, artists, and thinkers across cultures. The title is a direct allusion to the Qur'an sura 27:16, where Sulayman (Solomon) and Dāwūd (David) are said to have been taught the language, or speech, of the birds (manṭiq al-ṭayr).

== Synopsis ==
In the poem, the birds of the world gather to decide who is to be their sovereign, as they have none. The hoopoe, the wisest of them all, suggests that they should find the legendary Simorgh. The hoopoe leads the birds, each of whom represents a human fault which prevents humanity from attaining enlightenment.

The hoopoe tells the birds that they have to cross seven valleys in order to reach the abode of Simorgh. These valleys are as follows:

1. Valley of the Quest, where the Wayfarer begins by casting aside all dogma, belief, and unbelief.
2. Valley of Love, where reason is abandoned for the sake of love.
3. Valley of Knowledge, where worldly knowledge becomes utterly useless.
4. Valley of Detachment, where all desires and attachments to the world are given up. Here, what is assumed to be “reality” vanishes.
5. Valley of Unity, where the Wayfarer realizes that everything is connected and that the Beloved is beyond everything, including harmony, multiplicity, and eternity.
6. Valley of Wonderment, where, entranced by the beauty of the Beloved, the Wayfarer becomes perplexed and, steeped in awe, finds that he has never known or understood anything.
7. Valley of Poverty and Annihilation, where the self disappears into the universe and the Wayfarer becomes timeless, existing in both the past and the future.

Sholeh Wolpé writes, "When the birds hear the description of these valleys, they bow their heads in distress; some even die of fright right then and there. But despite their trepidations, they begin the great journey. On the way, many perish of thirst, heat or illness, while others fall prey to wild beasts, panic, and violence. Finally, only thirty birds make it to the abode of Simorgh. In the end, the birds learn that they themselves are the Simorgh; the name “Simorgh” in Persian means thirty (si) birds (morgh). They eventually come to understand that the majesty of that Beloved is like the sun that can be seen reflected in a mirror. Yet, whoever looks into that mirror will also behold his or her own image."

If Simorgh unveils its face to you, you will find
that all the birds, be they thirty or forty or more,
are but the shadows cast by that unveiling.
What shadow is ever separated from its maker?
Do you see?
The shadow and its maker are one and the same,
so get over surfaces and delve into mysteries.

== Commentary ==
Attar's use of symbolism is a key, driving component of the poem. This handling of symbolisms and allusions can be seen reflected in these lines:

It was in China, late one moonless night,
The Simorgh first appeared to mortal sight—

Beside the symbolic use of the Simorgh, the allusion to China is also very significant. According to Idries Shah, China as used here, is not the geographical China, but the symbol of mystic experience, as inferred from the Hadith (declared weak by Ibn Adee, but still used symbolically by some Sufis): "Seek knowledge; even as far as China". There are many more examples of such subtle symbols and allusions throughout the Mantiq. Within the larger context of the story of the journey of the birds, Attar masterfully tells the reader many didactic short, sweet stories in captivating poetic style.

Sholeh Wolpé, in the foreword of her modern translation of this work writes:

The parables in this book trigger memories deep within us all. The stories inhabit the imagination, and slowly over time, their wisdom trickles down into the heart. The process of absorption is unique to every individual, as is each person’s journey. We are the birds in the story. All of us have our own ideas and ideals, our own fears and anxieties, as we hold on to our own version of the truth. Like the birds of this story, we may take flight together, but the journey itself will be different for each of us. Attar tells us that truth is not static, and that we each tread a path according to our own capacity. It evolves as we evolve. Those who are trapped within their own dogma, clinging to hardened beliefs or faith, are deprived of the journey toward the unfathomable Divine, which Attar calls the Great Ocean.

Wolpé further writes: "The book is meant to be not only instructive but also entertaining."

== English translations ==
- FitzGerald, Edward (tr.) (1889), Bird Parliament: A Bird's-Eye view of the Bird Parliament, London and New York: Macmillan and Co.
- Nott, Charles Stanley (tr.) (1954), The Conference of The Birds: Mantiq Ut-Tair; a Philosophical Religious Poem in Prose (1st ed.), London: The Janus Press, reissued by Routledge and Kegan Paul Ltd, 1961.
- Darbandi, Afkham (tr.); Davis, Dick (tr.) (1984), The Conference of the Birds, Penguin Classics, ISBN 0140444343, re-edited as The Canticle of the Birds, Diane de Sellier Éditeur, 2013.
- Avery, Peter (tr.) (1998), The Speech of the Birds, Islamic Texts Society, ISBN 0946621705.
- Masani, R. P. (tr.) (2001), Conference of the Birds: A Seeker's Journey to God, Weiser Books, ISBN 1609252233.
- Darbandi, Afkham (tr.); Davis, Dick (tr.) (2013), The Canticle of the Birds: Illustrated Through Persian and Eastern Islamic Art, Diane de Sellier, ISBN 2364370310.
- Wolpé, Sholeh (tr.) (2017), The Conference of the Birds, W. W. Norton & Co., ISBN 0393292193.

== La Conférence des oiseaux and other theatrical adaptations ==
Peter Brook and Jean-Claude Carrière adapted the poem into a play titled La Conférence des oiseaux (The Conference of the Birds), which they published in 1979. Brook toured embryonic versions of the play around rural Africa during the visit of his International Centre for Theatre Research to that continent in 1972–73, before presenting two extremely successful productions to Western audiences—one in New York City at La MaMa E.T.C., and one in Paris. John Heilpern gives an account of the events surrounding the early development of the play in his 1977 book Conference of the Birds: The Story of Peter Brook in Africa.

Sholeh Wolpe's stage adaptation of The Conference of the Birds was premiered by Inferno Theatre and Ubuntu Theater Project (now Oakland Theater Project), in Oakland California in November 2018.

== Illustrations ==
Collection at the Metropolitan Museum of Art, New York. Folio from an illustrated Persian manuscript dated c.1600. Paintings by Habiballah of Sava (active ca. 1590–1610), in ink, opaque watercolor, gold, and silver on paper, dimensions 25,4 x 11,4 cm.

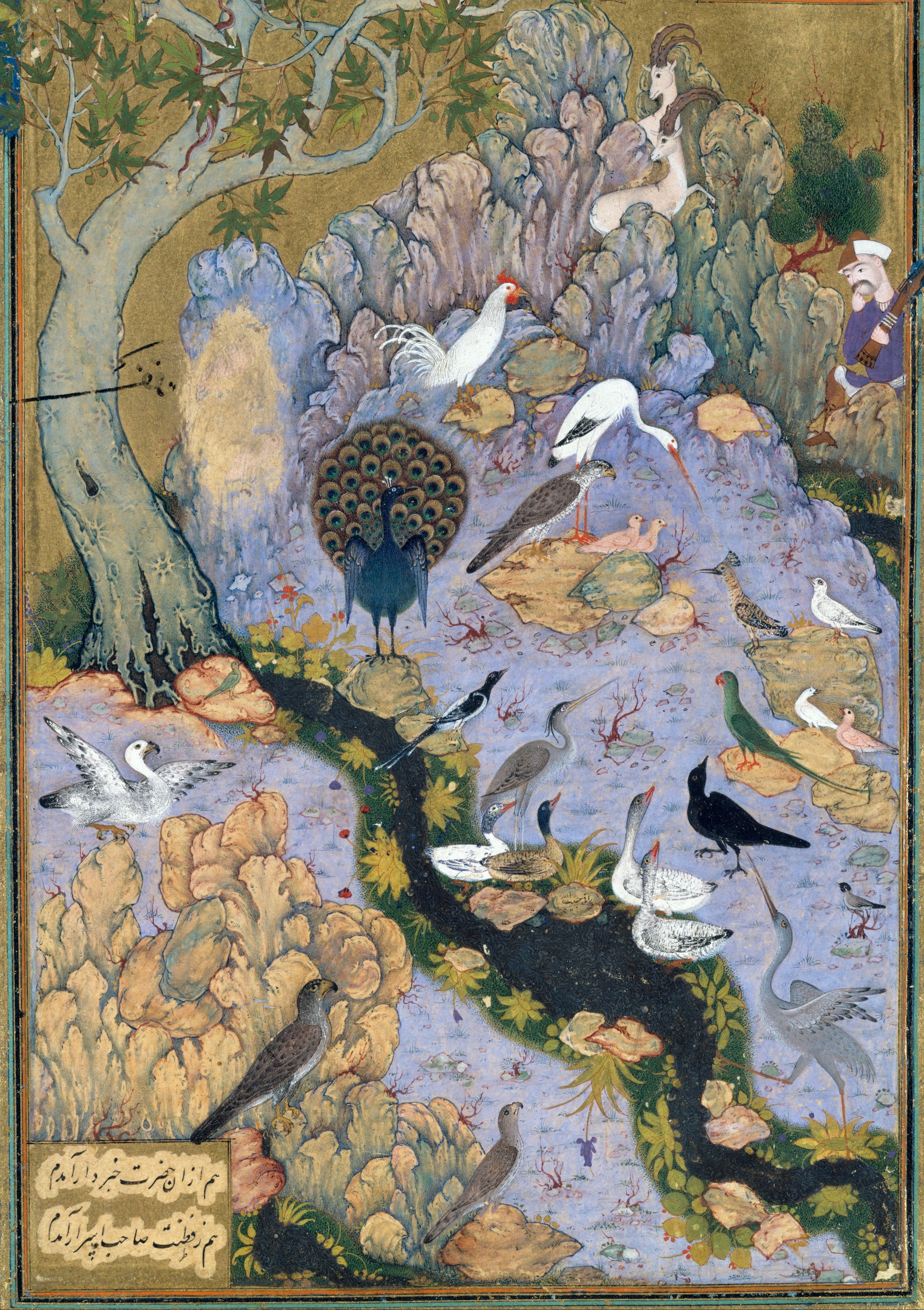

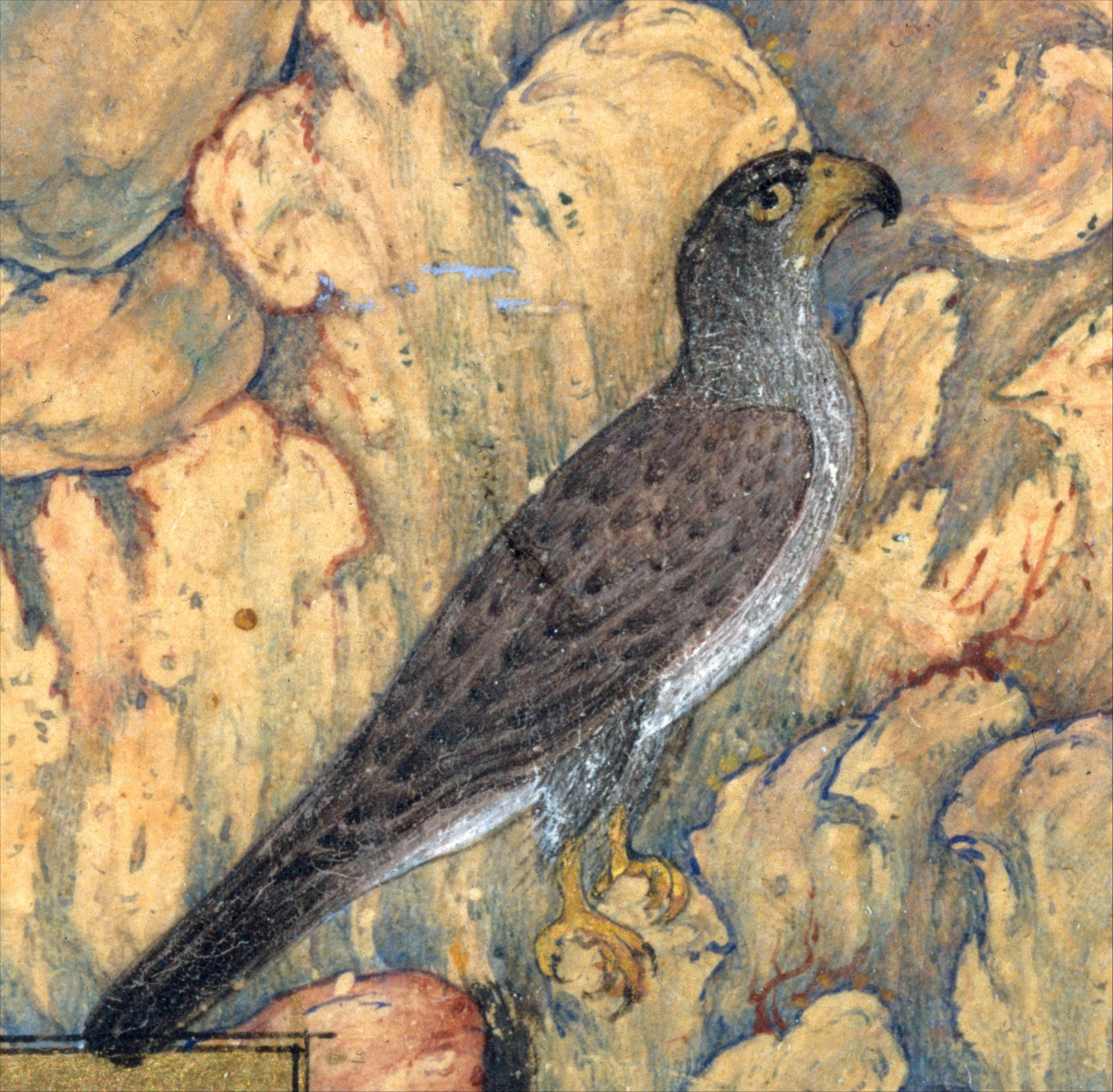

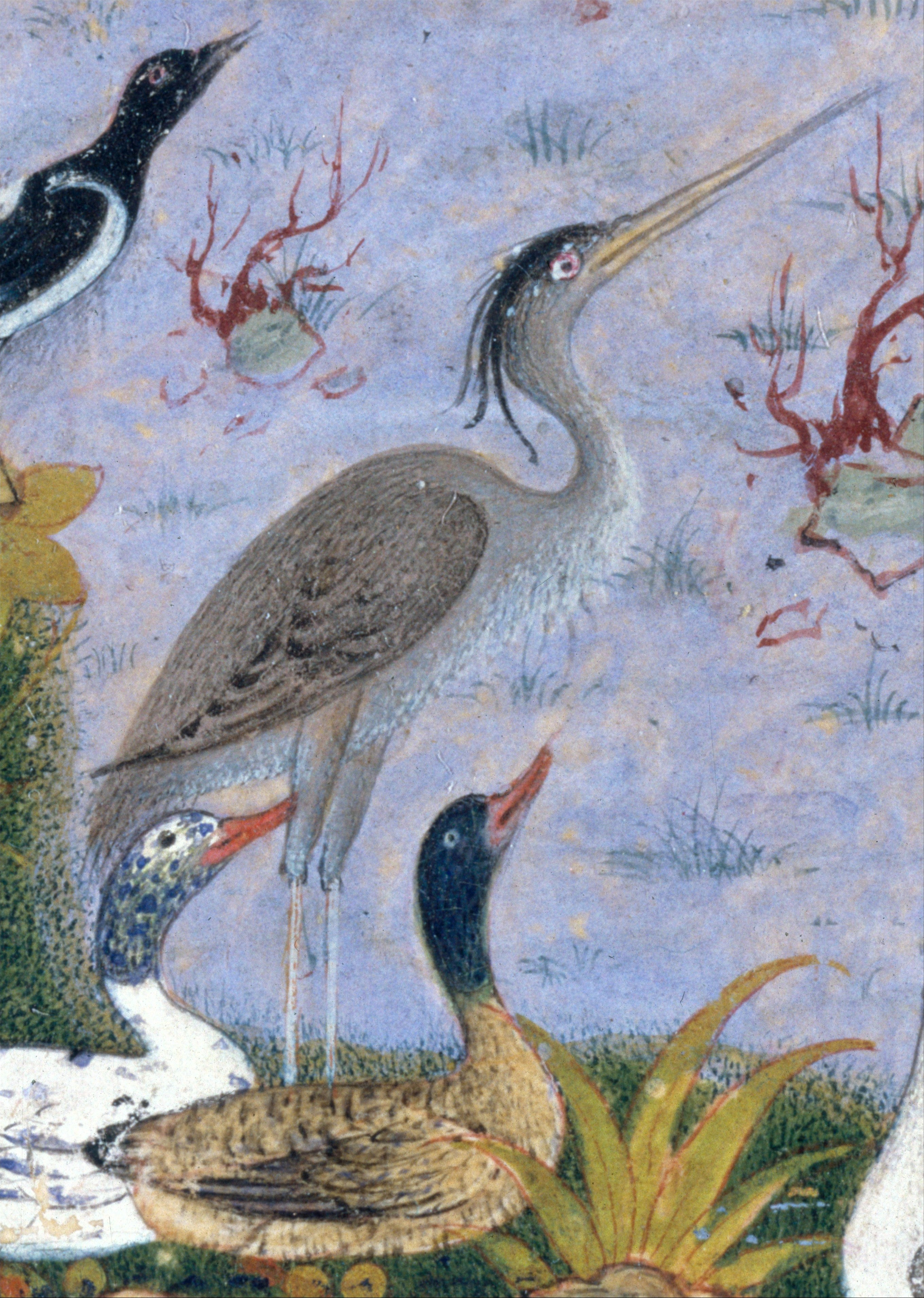

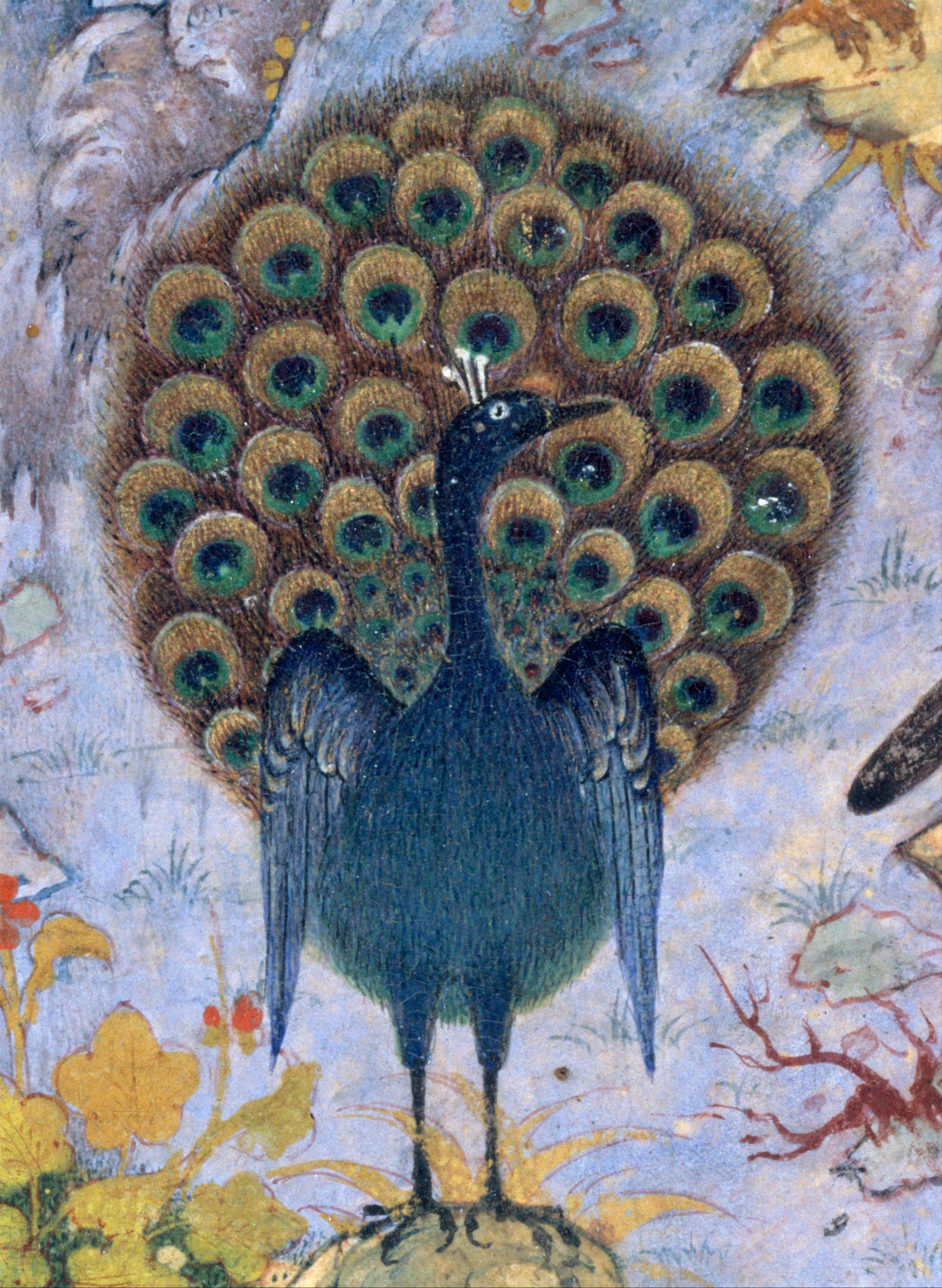

== See also ==
- Language of the birds
- Panentheism
- Parlement of Foules
- Persian literature
- The Approach to Al-Mu'tasim
- The Seven Valleys (Baháʼí Faith)

== Sources ==
- Attar (2017), Conference of the Birds, translated by Sholeh Wolpé, W. W. Norton & Co, ISBN 9780393292183.
- Attar, Farid Ud-Din (1961) [1954], The Conference of The Birds, translated by C. S. Nott, Routledge and Kegan Paul, ISBN 0-7100-1032-X.
- Attar, Farid-Ud-Din (2001), Conference of the Birds: A Seeker's Journey to God, translated by R. P. Masani, Weiser Books, ISBN 1-57863-246-3.
- Chopra, R. M. (2014), Great Poets of Classical Persian, Sparrow Publication, pp. 127–144, ISBN 978-81-89140-75-5.
- Heilpern, John (1978) [1977], Conference of the Birds, The Bobs Merrill Company, Inc., ISBN 0-672-52489-9.
- Shah, Idries (2014) [1964], The Sufis, ISF Publishing, ISBN 978-1-78479-000-4.
- Wolpé, Sholeh (2017), Foreword, Conference of the Birds, by Attar, W. W. Norton & Co, ISBN 9780393292183.
