= Sart =

Historical term for settled inhabitants of Central Asia

Sārt is a term historically used to refer to certain categories of the settled population of Khwarazm (from the 17th century onward) and the Fergana Valley. In different periods and localities, the term could refer to Persian-speaking populations, certain Turkicised Persian-speaking groups; artisans, broadly corresponding to the urban petty-bourgeois estate; while among the inhabitants of Samarkand Oblast in the 19th century, the word "Sart" was used in a derogatory sense.

Sart is a term encountered in the history and ethnography of Persian-speaking and Central Asian societies. In the 16th century, the nomadic Uzbeks who conquered Central Asia distinguished themselves clearly from the conquered settled population, which they referred to as "Sarts" regardless of linguistic or ethnic affiliation. This designation remained in use until the 19th century and was used in the Kokand and Khivan khanates.

Following the Russian conquest of Central Asia, the term "Sart" came to be used by the administration of the Turkestan Governor-Generalship, and subsequently by the Soviet authorities until 1926. Later, the term disappeared from both official usage and everyday speech. In the 1897 Russian Empire Census, respondents were asked about their native language. According to the census results, nearly one million people identified the Sart language as their native language. The Turkestani Jadids, followers of the ideology of Islamic modernism, opposed the use of the term "Sart".

Orientalists and ethnographers of the second half of the 19th and early 20th centuries had no consensus or clear understanding of what the ethnographic construct of the "Sart" represented. Some held that "Sarts are Tajiks", others that "Sarts are settled inhabitants", while still others regarded them as a "mixed nationality".

== Etymology ==
The word sārt is an Indo-Aryan loanword from Sanskrit sārthaḥ ('caravan') and sārthavāha ('caravan-leader' or 'merchant') into Turkic languages, via an Iranian language (probably Sogdian or Parthian sartvā) and Uyghur sartbāu. It retained its original meaning of merchant until 11th century, when it increasingly came to mean 'town-dweller', or the Iranian-speaking settled population, as opposed to the Turkic nomads. Under the Mongol Empire, the derived terms like sartaul and sartaqtai were generally applied on Iranian Muslims, making it an ethnonym.

== History and geography of the use of the term Sart ==
Sart is a term encountered in the history and ethnography of Persian-speaking and Central Asian societies. Originally, in the Old Turkic language, the word denoted a merchant. In this sense, it occurs in 11th-century written sources, such as the encyclopedic dictionary Dīwān Lughāt al-Turk (Compendium of the Turkic Dialects) by Mahmud al-Kashgari and Kutadgu Bilig (Wisdom Which Brings Royal Glory) by Yusuf Balasaguni.

At a time when Persians controlled the trade routes leading toward the nomads, Mongols and Turks referred to Persians as Sarts or Tajiks. Since the Persians were a settled Muslim population, the term Sart was extended to all settled Muslims regardless of language or place of residence.

In the post-Mongol period, "Sart" became synonymous with "Tajik" and referred to the Persian-speaking settled or urban population, in contrast to the term "Turk", which referred to the Turkic-speaking nomadic or semi-nomadic population.

In the 16th century, the nomadic Uzbeks who conquered Central Asia distinguished themselves clearly from the conquered settled population, which they referred to as "Sarts" regardless of linguistic or ethnic affiliation. The distinction between Uzbeks and Sarts (Tajiks) was now perceived more sharply than the earlier distinction between Turks and Sarts, since some pre-Uzbek Chaghatay Turkic tribes had already adopted a settled way of life. This use of the term Sart continued until the 19th century.

The mass migration of Turkic and Turkicised Mongol nomads into Transoxiana as a result of the Uzbek invasion led to a sharp intensification of the Turkicisation of the indigenous Iranian population. By the 19th century, both the Turkicisation of the Iranians and the adoption of a settled way of life by the Uzbeks had reached an advanced stage. The term Sart, which originally denoted settled Iranians and later Persian-speaking and Turkic-speaking urban inhabitants, came to be used mainly for Turkic-speaking or bilingual urban inhabitants. At the same time, the term Tajik, previously synonymous with Sart, came to be used specifically for Persian-speaking populations. Moreover, Sarts, as urban inhabitants or agriculturalists of Bukhara and Kokand, were contrasted with the nomads known as "Kazakhs", while in Khwarazm the corresponding contrast was with Turkmens.

Although in the 19th and early 20th centuries Russian and European researchers began using the term Sart for Turkic-speaking urban inhabitants whom they regarded as the "indigenous inhabitants" of Central Asia, V. V. Bartold was sceptical of this interpretation, as he found no direct evidence for it in historical sources.

As noted by V. V. Bartold and Yuri E. Bregel, no attempts had been made to determine the dialectal differences between Sarts and Uzbeks in either Bukhara or Khiva, although such differences certainly existed and probably justified treating the Sarts as a distinct ethnic group. However, as noted by M. E. Subtelny, a professor of Persian and Islamic Studies at the University of Toronto, the close symbiosis between nomadic Turks and settled Persians in Central Asia, which had existed for centuries, resulted in mutual linguistic and ethnogenetic influences, making it extremely difficult, if not impossible, to identify distinctions between them.

In the 14th century, as a result of interaction between nomadic Turks and the settled local population in Transoxiana, a "historical-cultural complex" emerged, whose bearers, according to B. Kh. Karmysheva, came to be called Chaghatay Turks from the beginning of the 15th century. The word "Chaghatay" came to be used in a sense close to that of an ethnonym. Following the defeat of the remnants of the Timurid state by the nomadic Uzbeks in the early 16th century, the local settled population—Turks and Tajiks—continued to call themselves, in contrast to the Uzbeks, the Chaghatay people. As Karmysheva noted, "the term Chaghatay tended to expand its meaning" and to overlap with the terms "Tat" in Khorasan, "Tajik" and "Sart" in Transoxiana. The terms "Tat", "Tajik", and "Sart" were initially used to designate Iranian-speaking populations, but as Turks adopted a settled way of life and the populations of the oases came to share a common economic and domestic way of life despite linguistic differences, the terms came to be applied to the inhabitants of the cultural oases of Transoxiana and eastern Khorasan regardless of language.

In the 19th century, the term "Sart" referred to a specific ethnographic group in Fergana and Tashkent. In the central regions of Uzbekistan, primarily in the territory of the former Emirate of Bukhara, the Khorezm Archaeological and Ethnographic Expedition of the Academy of Sciences of the USSR showed that the term was rarely used or not used at all.

As Karmysheva noted, the term Sart denoted the settled population of the cultural oases and was widespread in southern Kazakhstan, Fergana, and Khwarazm. In these oases, it was also used as a self-designation by the settled population. In Iran and Khorasan, however, the term "Tat" was used. In the territories of the former Emirate of Bukhara, neither "Sart" nor "Tat" was used. Among the descendants of the Dasht-i Qipchaq Uzbeks, the equivalent of these terms was "Tajik", which they used not as an ethnonym but as a designation of a cultural type, that is, the indigenous settled population.

=== Sarts of the Khanate of Kokand ===
Rashid Nabiev, in his 1973 book From the History of the Khanate of Kokand, explained that the term "Sart" referred to the settled agricultural and urban Uzbek and Tajik population of the plains of Turkestan.

Timur Beisembiev, a historian and Orientalist specialising in Persian- and Turkic-language manuscript sources and the history of the Khanate of Kokand, studied various manuscript copies of the Kokand historiographical work Tarikh-i Shahrukhi (History of Shahrukh) by Mulla Niyaz Muhammad Khokandi in the 1980s. The work covers the entire history of the Khanate of Kokand from the beginning of the 18th century to the early 1870s.

According to Tarikh-i Shahrukhi, the ethnic composition of the Khanate of Kokand was diverse. In addition to numerous nomadic peoples, the settled inhabitants of Fergana were described as Sarts, Tajiks, and Uzbeks. According to Beisembiev, the ethnonym "Sart" (sartiyya) in Khokandi's work had both a narrow and a broader meaning, the latter denoting the entire settled population of Fergana in opposition to the nomadic population (ilatiyya).

According to Khokandi's description of the ethnic composition of the regions of the Khanate of Kokand, the settled inhabitants of the Tashkent region and Kurama were Sarts, Tajiks, and "Andis". In the domain of Ura-Tyube, the settled population consisted of Sarts and Tajiks. Analysing the primary source, Beisembiev concluded that the most numerous populations in Fergana were Sarts, Kipchaks, and Kyrgyz, while in the Tashkent region and Kurama they were Sarts, Kurama, and Kazakhs.

The first chapter of Tarikh-i Shahrukhi, in its account of the accession of Shah Rukh Khan in 1709 and the foundation of Kokand, states that numerous settlements around the site where Kokand would later be founded were inhabited by Uzbeks and Sarts.

=== Sarts of the Khanate of Khiva ===
The Orientalist Yuri E. Bregel conducted research on the subject and published a study entitled The Sarts in the Khanate of Khiva in 1978.

The main conclusions of his research were:

- First, the Sarts of the Khanate of Khiva differed from the Uzbeks, at least until the first half of the 19th century. They differed in origin: the Sarts descended from the ancient settled population of Khwarazm. They differed in cultural traditions, as they were urban inhabitants or peasants. They differed geographically, as the Sarts were concentrated mainly in the southern part of the state. They also differed in social status: the Sarts were rayas, that is, a tax-paying estate, while the Uzbeks were sipahis, or warriors. There was also a distinction in the role played by their leaders in the administration of the state.
- Second, the term Sarts was a self-designation of this population group until 1917. The Sarts were clearly regarded by the Uzbeks as a separate ethnic group, or another people.
- Third, although the Sarts of Khwarazm spoke a Turkic dialect in the 19th century that was close to but distinct from the dialect of nomadic and semi-nomadic Uzbeks, there were indirect indications that they were probably bilingual and that at least some of them also used Persian or Tajik.
- Fourth, the gradual integration of these two parts of the population of Khwarazm, Sarts and Uzbeks, occurred at all levels. Geographically, Uzbeks settled in the southern parts of the country and mixed with the Sarts. Socially, Uzbeks became taxpayers, while Sarts began to serve as nukers. Politically, the Sart aristocracy more or less successfully began to share power with the Uzbeks. Culturally, the Uzbeks adopted a settled way of life and became urban inhabitants or peasants. Linguistically, the Turkicisation of the Sarts was probably completed in the 19th century. However, because this linguistic process was recent, integration had not been fully completed by the beginning of the 20th century.

Consequently, both from the perspective of the self-identification of the local population and that of European observers, they remained two distinct peoples, although very closely related to one another.

=== Sarts of East Turkestan ===
The modern ethnonym "Uyghur" was not used in Russian-language sources of the 19th century. The terms "Kashgaris", "Sarts", and "Tatars of Eastern (Chinese) Turkestan" were used instead.

N. V. Bogayavlensky, who had served as a Russian consul in western China in the late 19th and early 20th centuries, noted in his description of the city of Kashgar that Chinese and Muslims lived separately there. The Chinese consisted only of the administration and troops, and "the Chinese element disappears among the Turkic one", while the Muslim population of Kashgar was "represented exclusively by Sarts". By Sarts, the author meant the Uyghurs. (Note: Klyashtorny and Kolesnikov specifically noted that Bogayavlensky used the term "Sart" to refer to the modern Uyghurs.)

Zarubin considered the Kashgaris of East Turkestan to be a Turkicised Iranian population that differed from the Uzbek Sarts "only by minor dialectal features". He claimed that the Taranchis called themselves Sarts and later, together with the Kashgaris, adopted the name Uyghurs.

=== Origin of the term "Sart" ===
In the 1890s, Bartold conducted a special study of the origin of the term "Sart" and its use during different historical periods. This study was prompted by his scholarly dispute in the press with Ser-Ali Lapin, an ethnic Kazakh translator working for the governor of Samarkand.

The term "Sart" carried different meanings during different periods. As Bartold noted, the term Sart occurs in 11th-century Turkic literature, but "not as a name of a people", but as a common noun denoting a merchant.

In Turkic Buddhist literature, the word sartbau, a distorted form of the Sanskrit sarthavaha or sarthabaha, meaning "caravan leader", occurs. According to Bartold, through linguistic reinterpretation the Turks transformed it into sartbashi, "chief of the Sarts", from which the word "Sart" in the sense of "merchant" developed. (Note: In Radloff's Uyghur translation from Chinese of the Saddharmapundarika, the Sanskrit word "sarthavaha", or "sarthabaha", meaning "merchant, caravan leader", is explained as "senior merchant" ("satikchi udugi"). Radloff therefore concluded that the Turkic "Sart" was borrowed from an Indian language (Kuan-si-im Pusar, 37).)

Mongols of the 13th century used words derived from this root, such as "sartaq" and "sartaul", in the sense of "Tajik" and "Muslim". Sartaqs referred not only to Persians but also to Muslim Turks. (Note: Vasily Bartold wrote: Most importantly, the word "Sart" does not occur in works from the pre-Mongol period and was first used by the Mongols. According to Rashid al-Din, the Mongols used the word sartaq in the sense of "Tajik"; according to him, they first applied this word to Arslan Khan of the Qarluqs, the first of the Muslim rulers with whom Genghis Khan had to deal. From this it may be concluded that the Mongols used this name for all Muslims without distinction, especially since the Qarluqs were undoubtedly a Turkic people rather than an Aryan one. Thus, the explanation of the word Sart should probably be sought in the Mongolian language. Without knowledge of that language, we cannot offer our own explanation; but that a corresponding root existed in the Mongolian language is already apparent from the name of the second Golden Horde khan, Sartaq. Already during the campaigns of Genghis Khan, the Turks sought to draw closer to the Mongols, in contrast to the urban population, which at that time was Aryan in language and origin; it is therefore very likely that as a result of this rapprochement the Mongols began to call not all Muslims Sarts, but only those Aryans who had retained their distinctiveness, and that the term then passed from the Mongols to the Turks. Source: V. Bartold, Works on Individual Problems of the History of Central Asia, Vol. 2.)

According to Bartold's research, in the 15th century the descendants of the Mongols in Turkestan used the word "Sart" in the sense of "Tajik", contrasting the language and literature of the Sarts with Turkic language and literature. A 14th-century anonymous Arab philologist, in a work on the Mongolian language, translated the word "sartaul" as "Muslim". As Bartold noted, the words "Sart" and "sartaul" were used in the states of Central Asia and Persia established by the Mongols and united under Timur's rule at the end of the 14th century as synonyms for "Tajik". Under Timur's descendants, references began to be made to the language and literature of the Sarts in contrast to the language and literature of the Turks, meaning that Sarts generally referred to Persians. Bartold also noted that the description of the Kabul region by Babur, found by A. N. Samoylovich, in which it is stated that Sarts differed from Tajiks, stands completely alone. (Note: Bartold wrote that "it is unknown what Babur considered to be the difference between Tajiks and Sarts". In his list of languages "spoken in the Kabul region, neither the Sart language nor the Tajik language is mentioned, but only Persian (Farsi)".) Elsewhere in Babur's work Tajiks are not mentioned. Thus, in his description of Fergana, only the Sarts and their language are contrasted with the Turks and their language.

In the 16th century, nomadic Uzbeks began referring to all settled inhabitants, both Turks and Tajiks (Persians), as Sarts. After Turkic became the main language of the settled population, the word "Sart" came to be used in literature and everyday life in the sense of an "urban inhabitant" or "rural inhabitant" who spoke Turkic rather than Persian. Sarts were now contrasted not with Uzbeks, who by that time were mostly settled, but with "Kazakhs". (Note: The poet Ali-Shir Nava'i (1441–1501) referred to people who did not know the Turkic language as Sarts.)

Discussing the evolution of the term and its use during the period of Russian Turkestan, V. Bartold concluded that "Sart" came to be used as a designation for "settled Turks as the majority of the settled population".

Most modern researchers accept the results of V. V. Bartold's early 20th-century research concerning the origin of the term "Sart" and the "change in the meaning of the term Sart" over time.

==== Criticism ====
The American historian of Pakistani origin Adeeb Khalid sharply criticised the methodology of Bartold, Bregel, and the entire "Orientalist enterprise". Khalid raised a number of objections, including that "most of Bartold's evidence derives from several scattered references in historical sources, all of which were produced at court and concerned court elites". In his view, "there is no reason to assume that people whom court chronicles classified as Turks felt any particular affinity among themselves, or that the Turk–Tajik or Uzbek–Sart distinctions mentioned in literary sources necessarily implied anything other than distinctions among court elites". He also argued that "among settled populations without tribal divisions, geographical affiliation played a similar role. Thus, the settled Turkic-speaking population of Khwarazm, called 'Sart' in Khwarazm, was called Urganji in Bukhara", after the city of Urgench. Bregel rejected these accusations in his review article Recent Publications on the Sarts: A Review Article. (Note: In his review of Khalid's work as it related to the Sarts, Bregel wrote: Unfortunately, Khalid ... not only failed to add anything of his own to the subject, but also considerably confused the existing picture. He engaged in lengthy denunciations of "Orientalists", "Orientalism", and the "Orientalist enterprise" in the spirit of Edward Said. Bregel's review. In response to Khalid's accusation: Although Orientalists carefully studied the etymology of the term and its appearances in historical texts, they did not stoop to examining how the term was actually used in practice (although this had never been the aim of Orientalism). Bregel responded that this accusation "is completely false". Khalid's assertion that... Bartold's approach was in many respects typical of the Orientalist enterprise. The etymology of the term "Sart" was central to determining who the Sarts were. Bregel considered this absurd: "This is simply an absurd assertion". In response to Khalid's accusation: Most of Bartold's evidence derives from several scattered references to historical sources, all of which were produced at court and concerned court elites. Bregel responded: This statement by Khalid demonstrates his disregard for the medieval written historical sources of Central Asia—and for Islamic historiography in general. First, not all of the sources used by Bartold in his discussion of the term "Sart" were "produced at court" or could be characterised as "concerned with court elites". Second, the fact that the references were "scattered" in no way diminishes their significance. Indeed, the opposite may be true: several passing remarks, made in passing as something self-evident, may provide better information about the ideas and approaches of medieval historians than lengthy treatises.)

== Sarts in the Russian Empire ==
In Russia, perceptions of the composition of the population of Central Asia remained quite approximate even in the mid-18th century, although attempts at classification were made. Classifications could place "Kirghiz-Kaisaks" and "Tashkentis" alongside one another. Russians were familiar with the terms "Uzbeks" and "Tajiks", but there was no clear understanding of who these groups were or how they differed from each other. There was also no clear understanding of what should constitute the "unit" of description.

In the 19th century, the principal basis for classifying the population became an ethnic, or, as it was then called, "tribal", criterion. However, as Bartold wrote in the early 20th century, "the settled inhabitant of Central Asia considers himself first and foremost a Muslim, and only then an inhabitant of a particular city or locality; the idea of belonging to a particular people has no significance for him".

By the middle of the 19th century, a simplified binary Uzbek/Tajik classification had been adopted. After the incorporation into the Russian Empire of the Khanate of Kokand, which included the Fergana Valley and the city of Tashkent, Russian researchers encountered the term "Sart". Initially, Sarts were equated with Tajiks, but it became clear that the local population distinguished between Sarts and Tajiks. Although similar to Tajiks in appearance, way of life, and culture, the Sarts of Fergana and Tashkent spoke a Turkic language that was regarded as the language of the nomadic Uzbeks. The way out of this confusing situation was to regard the Sarts as a separate people.

=== Sarts in the administrative system of the Russian Empire ===
In the second half of the 19th century, during the Russian conquest of Central Asia, Orientalists and the colonial administration encountered the term "Sart". It was used as a self-designation by settled Uzbeks in the Tashkent, Fergana, and Khwarazm oases, while nomadic peoples such as the Kazakhs and semi-nomadic Uzbeks used the term in reference to settled Uzbeks and, in part, lowland Tajiks. (Note: An article in the Great Soviet Encyclopedia: Sarts are the originally settled part of the Uzbeks. Before the October Revolution of 1917, the name "Sarts" was used in reference to settled Uzbeks and, in part, lowland Tajiks mainly by the semi-nomadic part of the Uzbeks and by Kazakhs. In the Tashkent, Fergana, and Khwarazm oases and in southern Kazakhstan, it was a self-designation of settled Uzbeks. Today the name "Sarts" survives only in scholarly literature.)

In 1867, the Russian Emperor Alexander II established a new imperial administrative unit from the conquered territories of Central Asia, the Turkestan Governor-Generalship. Its internal administration was governed by the "Regulation on the Administration of the Semirechye and Syr Darya Oblasts". The "native population of Turkestan" was administratively divided into two parts corresponding to the territories inhabited by "two nationalities—the Sarts and the Kirghiz". According to the authors of the regional statute, the Sarts led a settled way of life, while the Kirghiz were nomadic. Each group was provided with its own form of self-government and judicial administration, separate rules for land ownership and use, and different taxation.

From the second half of the 19th century, Russian Orientalists referred to the Turkic speech of the settled population of Transoxiana as "Sart". Grammars and dictionaries of the Sart language were published. In Tashkent, the centre of the Turkestan Governor-Generalship, the Turkestan Native Newspaper (Turkistan wilayatining gazeti) was published in Old Uzbek (Sart) and Old Kyrgyz.

Khalid noted that in Russian bureaucratic practice the term "Sart" was used exclusively to designate the Turkic-speaking part of the settled population of Central Asia, while the term "Tajik" was reserved for the Iranian-speaking settled population, and widespread bilingualism was ignored.

==== Sarts in the 1897 census ====
In 1897, the first general census of the Russian Empire was conducted. According to the scientific concepts prevailing at the time, "nationality" or "peoplehood" was determined by "native language", and the 1897 census did not ask about "nationality" but about "native language".

Modern researchers are critical of the results of this census with regard to ethnicity and consider the use of linguistic criteria as a tool for determining nationality to have been ineffective.

Abashin described the census results for the peoples of Turkestan as "astonishing". In Fergana Oblast, there were five times as many Sarts as Uzbeks, whereas in Samarkand Oblast there were 25 times as many Uzbeks as Sarts. Bartold explained this by noting that the statistician himself determined how the local population was to be classified: "...the Samarkand statistics recognised only Uzbeks, not Sarts, while the Fergana statistics recognised only Sarts, not Uzbeks." N. G. Malitsky explained the sympathy of the Samarkand Statistical Committee toward Uzbeks and its antipathy toward Sarts in this way. According to him, the word Sart began disappearing from official documents of Samarkand Oblast in the 1890s under the influence of the "well-known Samarkand figure" S. A. Lapin. V. P. Nalivkin, who favoured classifying Sarts as Uzbeks, was also a member of the Samarkand Statistical Committee. According to Abashin, the exclusion of the word "Sart" from the census results was carried out with their direct participation.

=== Scholarly and public debates ===
The first Russian ethnographic classification of the peoples of Central Asia was created in the first half of the 19th century. It was a highly simplified classification based on a binary Uzbek–Tajik opposition and corresponded to contemporary perceptions of the history of the Middle East. Uzbeks were described as speaking a Turkic language, having Mongoloid physical features, and leading a nomadic way of life. Tajiks were described as speaking an Iranian language, having European physical features, and engaging in agriculture and crafts. This scheme was followed by N. V. Khanykov and E. K. Meyendorff, who studied the Emirate of Bukhara in the 1830s, and by V. V. Veliaminov-Zernov in his description of the Khanate of Kokand.

By 1875, following the Russian conquest of a significant part of Central Asia, it became apparent that the binary scheme did not work. Much of the population of Fergana and the environs of Tashkent spoke a Turkic language but did not display pronounced Mongoloid features and led a settled way of life. The general term for them was Sarts.

Sarts are Tajiks. In the mid-19th century, a majority of specialists on Central Asia agreed that Sarts were Tajiks, or some related people, since both groups were physically indistinguishable and led similar ways of life. This view was shared by Alexander Burnes, Arminius Vambery, (Note: The Austro-Hungarian Orientalist Arminius Vambery, who disguised himself as a Muslim, visited Bukhara. In his work Travels in Central Asia, written in the 1860s, he described the Sarts of Khwarazm as follows: The Sarts, called Tajiks in Bukhara and Kokand, are the ancient Persian population of Khwarazm, and their number here is relatively small. Gradually they mixed their native Persian language with Turkic. The Sarts, like the Tajiks, can be recognised by their cunning and elegance; the Uzbeks do not like them very much. Although they have lived together for five centuries, mixed marriages between Uzbeks and Sarts were very rare. Elsewhere in his work Vambery described the origin of the Sarts as "the Turkicised descendants of the ancient Khwarazmians". Vambery also noted that Uzbeks distinguished between a Sart and a Tajik, considering that Tajiks had recently settled among the Uzbeks and still retained their Iranian dialect, whereas the Sarts had been settled there for a long time and had adopted the Turkic language.) Yuri D. Yuzhakov, Alexander Khorooshkhin, and Afanasiy Grebenkin.

Over time, many Russian scholars came to understand that the concept of "Sart" confused researchers because of its ambiguity. Various interpretations began to emerge.

Sarts are settled inhabitants. The view that Sarts were settled inhabitants was shared by Alexei P. Fedchenko, Lev F. Kostenko, (Note: In his 1871 book Central Asia and the Establishment of Russian Civilization Therein, he distinguished the "principal branches of the population of Turan" into "Iranian tribes" and "Turkic tribes". Regarding the Sarts, Kostenko concluded that the word "Sart" was a designation for urban inhabitants and merchants in contrast to nomads and even agriculturalists.) Leonid N. Sobolev. In his 1874 work Geographical and Statistical Information on the Zeravshan District, Sobolev wrote that "...Sart is not a separate tribe... A Sart is indiscriminately an Uzbek or Tajik who lives in a city and engages in trade. It is a kind of petty bourgeoisie, an estate..." The same view was held by Charles-Eugene Ujfalvy, (Note: Ujfalvy, who visited Fergana, wrote in Anthropological Atlas of the Peoples of Fergana (1879): "...In Turkestan, all settled and urban inhabitants, with the exception of Tajiks, are called Sarts, regardless of origin..." According to Abashin, Ujfalvy placed Uzbeks closer to the Sarts than Tajiks.) Samuil M. Dudin, and V. I. Kushelevsky. (Note: In 1891, V. I. Kushelevsky published Materials for the Medical Geography and Sanitary Description of Fergana Oblast, in which he wrote that the Sarts constituted a "mixed but definite type" and concluded that "Sarts now generally means 'settled inhabitants', including descendants of Chinese".)

Sarts are a mixed nationality. Another line of argument held that the Sarts were a distinct people of mixed origin.

Pyotr I. Pashino, in his travel notes The Turkestan Region in 1866, suggested that the Sarts were descendants of Persian settlers from the time of Genghis Khan and that their Mongolian features resulted from mixed marriages. (Note: Orientalist Pyotr I. Pashino was tasked by the Russian Geographical Society with studying "the origin of the Sarts". He presented the results in his travel notes The Turkestan Region in 1866. Pashino suggested that the Sarts were descendants of Persian settlers from the time of Genghis Khan and that their Mongolian features resulted from marriages with "Tatar, Kirghiz, and Kipchak girls". The type and character of a Sart at first acquaintance indicate his Aryan origin. Of course, many individuals can be found in the Turkestan region who call themselves Sarts and bear unmistakable traces of Mongolian origin. But this circumstance should not contradict my argument concerning the origin of the Sarts. At the same time, he disagreed with the complete identification of Tajiks and Sarts, considering the Tajiks of Turkestan Oblast to be "pure-blooded Persians", former slaves who had recently been resettled there, while the Persian origin of the Sarts was merely a "conjecture". As an additional argument, he referred to self-identification. A Sart "would be very offended if he were called a Tajik", since he regarded a Tajik as a slave and "in his soul a Shiite", that is, almost an infidel.) The military Orientalist Mikhail A. Terentyev also treated the Sarts as a separate people.

==== Ostroumov's "Sarts" ====
In Turkestan, the position of Nikolai P. Ostroumov had considerable influence. He was a representative of the Kazan school of missionary Islamic studies. In May 1877, Ostroumov became inspector of public schools in the Turkestan region, and in 1883 editor of the Turkestan Native Newspaper. In 1884, he published a series of articles in Turkestanskie Vedomosti under the general title "The Meaning of the Word 'Sart'", while in 1890 his book The Sarts was published and subsequently reissued in 1896 and 1908.

Ostroumov noted the diversity of opinions concerning the Sarts and the complexity of the issue, which required joint work by an ethnologist, historian, and philologist. He analysed the literature available at the time and considered the following facts to be firmly established:

1. Sarts is an ancient designation.
1. "Etymologically", the term denotes a settled inhabitant of Turkestan, in contrast to nomads.
1. "Ethnographically", the Sarts represent a mixed but definite type characterised by the Turkic language.
1. Sarts should not be confused with Tajiks, the "indigenous Iranians", who speak Persian.
1. As a mixed type, the Sarts possess sharp and contradictory characteristics.
1. There is nothing insulting in the word Sart, although nomads use it with a derogatory connotation.

Ostroumov emphasised that the Sarts were a people of mixed origin, neither Iranian nor Turkic. The characteristics of the Turkic language and settled way of life did not contradict each other but interacted to form a new people.

The weak point in this construction was the language of the Sarts. From the perspective of 19th-century scholarship, language was one of the principal characteristics of a nationality. Ostroumov, who was not a philologist, had to seek evidence for a separate "Sart language". In 1907, he published an article in which, citing the British philologist Max Müller, he attempted to prove the independent character of the Sart language. Modern researchers regard this attempt as unsuccessful.

In the third edition of The Sarts, published in 1908, Ostroumov presented the debate between Bartold and Lapin in detail. Ostroumov sided with Bartold but could not ignore Lapin's position. Although he acknowledged the closeness of Sarts and Uzbeks, he continued to criticise Lapin's position on language, arguing that Lapin's proposed designation "New Uzbek language instead of Sart" could not be established "at the whim of one person".

According to Abashin, Ostroumov sought to emphasise that the Sarts were a people of mixed origin, neither Iranian nor Turkic. This effort had a broader political context. Ostroumov was a pupil of N. I. Ilminsky. Ilminsky believed that the formation of a broad Islamic-Tatar community in the Volga region posed a serious obstacle to the integration and assimilation of the non-Russian population into an all-Russian nation. There was also a fear of the emergence of an "internal enemy" who would support the Ottoman Empire, a rival of the Russian Empire. Among the means of countering these processes, Ilminsky considered supporting different local identities while emphasising their non-Turkic and non-Islamic elements. According to Abashin, Ostroumov applied Ilminsky's views to Turkestan and believed that the ideal result of Russian policy there would be the integration of the local population with the Russian Orthodox majority of the empire. However, Islam represented the principal obstacle to this rapprochement. Abashin therefore writes that "attempts to stimulate a Sart identity among the settled natives of Russian Turkestan are entirely understandable within the framework of the anti-Islamic and anti-Tatar doctrine of the conservative part of the Russian elite".

==== Lapin–Bartold debate ====
In the 1890s, a public debate took place in the press between the Orientalist V. V. Bartold and Sher-Ali (Ser-Ali) Lapin, a local official, Orientalist, translator to the governor of Samarkand, and ethnic Kazakh. Lapin opposed the use of the term "Sart" by the Russian administration. In 1893, language courses were organised for local administrative officials, and the curriculum included the study of the Sart language. This provoked a negative reaction, and Ser-Ali Lapin published an article entitled "The Sarts and Their Language" in the newspaper Orenburg Listok. He argued that there was neither a Sart people nor a Sart language, and that Sarts were an insulting nickname for Uzbeks and Tajiks given to them by the Kazakhs, meaning the insulting expression sary-it ("yellow dog"). Abashin also emphasised that there was an established tradition among Russian scholars, dating from Grebenkin and Kostenko in the 1870s, of treating the term "Sart" derogatorily, against which Bartold opposed himself in the 1890s.

Bartold, who was in Central Asia at the time, published an article in the newspaper Okraina in 1894 entitled "On the Teaching of Native Dialects in Samarkand". There he responded sharply to Lapin's claims, rejected his theory of the Kyrgyz origin of the word "Sart", and proposed his own theory of the ancient origin of the word. (Note: This theory of the origin of the term Sart was later developed by Bartold and became generally accepted in modern Oriental studies.) In Bartold's view, there were no grounds for removing the term from the ethnographic vocabulary, because although it originally had no ethnographic meaning, it was now used to designate a people. He called Lapin's explanation a simple folk etymology and accused him of an unscientific approach.

Lapin responded with an article in Turkestanskie Vedomosti. According to Lapin, the word Sart in "the languages of the Kazakh and the primitive Uzbeks" had a broad meaning encompassing Tajiks, settled Uzbeks, and other Turkic peoples who had adopted Tajik culture, that is, the entire settled population. He acknowledged the existence of an "Uzbek-Tajik mixture" which, according to him, had not adopted a special name but called itself Sarts. He also argued that there was no separate Sart people and no separate Sart language. He continued to insist that the name "Sart" had been given to the settled population by nomads.

In the mid-1890s, Lapin published a Concise Russian–Uzbek Dictionary in Samarkand. The term "Uzbek" was contrasted with the official designation "Sart language". As Abashin notes, Lapin formulated a new thesis in his article: he proposed calling the language of the Sarts "New Uzbek". In effect, he proposed renaming the Sarts as Uzbeks, considering language to be the principal factor of this community. Lapin's position, published in an official Turkestan newspaper, acquired the status of a legitimate concept.

In response, Bartold published an article in Turkestanskie Vedomosti entitled "Instead of a Reply to Mr Lapin" and later another article in the same newspaper, "More on the Word Sart". In these articles Bartold changed his position regarding Lapin's arguments: he no longer disputed Lapin's observations concerning contemporary Sarts and instead focused on the historical evolution of the word "Sart". Bartold wrote about the history of the Sarts and "traced how the term 'Sart' changed its meaning, but when it came to the present day, Bartold clearly felt uncertain". In 1898, Bartold also noted that even in official statistics the word Sart had no definite, universally recognised meaning and that Sarts were often confused with Uzbeks.

==== Jadid criticism ====
The local intellectual elite among the Jadids, supporters of reform in Muslim society, organised what Abashin described as an "obstruction" of the word Sart. The debate unfolded in the respected Tatar-language Orenburg newspaper Shura ("Council") in 1911–1912. It was initiated by Behram-bek Davlatshaev, a translator employed by the Bukharan government. In the newspaper's question-and-answer section, he asked: "Are we Sarts or Turks? Turkestan is the 'land of the Turks', so why are we called Sarts? Did Turks live here before, leave the country, and leave their name behind? And where did the Sart people live then, where did they come from, and when?" One of the most influential Jadids, the Samarkand native Mahmudhoja Behbudiy, responded and published an article there entitled "The Word 'Sart'—Unknown". He wrote that the origin of the word was unclear, that Central Asian inhabitants did not call themselves by this name, that northern neighbours such as Kazakhs and Tatars had given them this name, and that the Russians had borrowed it from the latter. Baqa Khoja supported Behbudiy's position in a subsequent article in Shura, rejecting the designation "Sart".

In 1912, the Turkologist M. F. Gavrilov published in Turkestanskie Vedomosti an article entitled "The Origin of the Word 'Sart'", containing a translation of a letter by a resident of Kokand, Muhammad-Amin Muhammad-Dzhanov, to the local newspaper Vaqt ("Time"), addressed to its Tatar publishers: "...Let it be known that the word 'Sart' is not the name of a nation; it was given to us by the Russians and has no basis..."

The debate flared up again in 1914 in the newspaper Oyna, edited by Behbudiy, in response to an article by the Bashkir historian Ahmed Zeki Validi Togan, in which he referred to "Sarts". Behram-bek Davlatshaev again expressed his dissatisfaction with "...writers who, without knowing that we Turkestanis belong to more than one hundred Turkic tribes, call us 'Sarts', as well as those who, while knowing perfectly well that we are Turks, call us 'Sarts'".

As noted by the German Turkologist Ingeborg Baldauf, "the complaint was in fact directed not so much against the Russians as against the Tatars, who in Central Asia played a kind of intermediary role between the indigenous population and the Russians. The insult from the 'elder brother' apparently offended them even more than the 'natural' contempt shown by a completely foreign ruler—the Russians".

In 1915, Behbudiy, as editor of Oyna, republished his earlier article on the term "Sart", substantially expanding and updating it. He repeated that "Sart" was used by Russians, Kazakhs, and Tatars to refer to the entire population of Turkestan, whether "Turks, Tajiks, or Arabs", while in Afghanistan, Iran, and India the Turkic-speaking population of the region was generally called "Uzbeks" or "Turks", and the word "Sart" was unknown there. Behbudiy also claimed that the term Sart was used only by Russians and a small number of Kazakhs and Tatars.

According to Bregel, the Jadids had at least two reasons for rejecting the term "Sart". The first was that most Jadids, regardless of their own ethnic background, adopted pan-Turkist ideology. This ideology regarded Central Asia, or Turan, as the homeland of the Turks, in which there was no place for an entity called "Sart". The second reason was that although the term "Sart" was known in the Emirate of Bukhara, it was used extremely rarely.

According to Khalid, Turkism influenced the worldview of the Turkestani Jadids. On this basis, the Jadids rejected the designation "Sarts", a general term by which "outsiders", Russians, Tatars, and Kazakhs referred to the settled population of Central Asia.

== Sarts under Soviet rule ==
The 1917 Revolution destroyed the previous structure of the state, and the new authorities entered into dialogue with the local Muslim elite. According to Abashin, the parties had to find a formula for an agreement that would both preserve the unity of the former country and provide some degree of political agency to the former "aliens" within the future political structure. One point of this informal agreement was the decision to abandon the term "Sart", which many considered to symbolise the great-power character of imperial rule during the period of "Tsarism". As a result, following the national delimitation of 1924–1925 and the all-Union census of 1926, the name "Sarts" disappeared completely from the ethnographic map of Central Asia.

In spring 1924, the Central Committee of the Russian Communist Party (Bolsheviks), in agreement with local leaders, decided to carry out the national delimitation of Central Asia. The largest state in the region became the Uzbek Soviet Socialist Republic, whose creation represented the final point in the compromises and agreements between the Bolsheviks and the local elite. The choice of the titular name "Uzbek" for the national state satisfied both sides. The Bolsheviks regarded it as a retreat from radical pan-Turkism, while local leaders, including the Jadids, gained a large Turkic space in which to implement their cultural projects.

As Bregel noted, the term Sart ultimately disappeared from administrative and political usage as a result of an administrative decree. In 1920, while preparing the national delimitation of Central Asia, V. I. Lenin wrote a short directive to prepare a map of Turkestan with its "division into Uzbekia, Kirghizia, and Turkmenia". There was no "Sartia" on the map, and therefore the Sarts were simply included in the category "Uzbeks". This was officially confirmed by the 1926 census, in which enumerators were instructed that persons who identified themselves as Sarts were to be recorded as Uzbeks. Accordingly, after 1926 the Sarts disappeared from the ethnographic map of Central Asia.

As Khalid noted, asserting the Turkic character of the population of Central Asia meant rejecting other designations of national belonging. Even before 1917, the Jadids objected to the term "Sart". What primarily dissatisfied the Jadids was that the term did not reflect the "actual" Turkic character of the groups to which it was applied. The criticism was so intense that by 1917 the word "Sart" disappeared from the political lexicon. As Khalid writes, its subsequent use provoked a sharp reaction from the nationalising intelligentsia. When the term "Sart" was used in 1922 in the Kazakh newspaper Ak Zhol in reference to the population of Tashkent, the writer Abdulla Qodiriy entered the debate. He wrote that the term "Sart" recalled the "times of Mr Ostroumov" and clearly insulted "us, Uzbeks, [who] fought against the word 'Sart', regardless of who attached it to us and for what reasons". The Sarts were also excluded from the political and ethnographic lexicon because no group claimed the right to be designated by this term.

== Historiography of works on the Sarts ==
In 2008, the American Orientalist Yuri E. Bregel published the review article "Recent Publications on the Sarts: A Review Article" on the historiography of works concerning the Sarts. Although the Sarts disappeared from the ethnographic map of Central Asia in 1926, they did not disappear from scholarly debates and frequently appeared as "so-called Sarts", with explanations that the name referred to Uzbeks who lacked or had lost their tribal affiliation.

In the same year, 1926, the prominent Russian linguist Evgeny Polivanov published in Tashkent his study Ethnographic Characteristics of the Uzbeks, Issue 1: The Origin and Name of the Uzbeks, in which he attempted to determine the language spoken by the Sarts. He noted that it differed from the language of the nomadic Uzbeks through a stronger influence of Tajik. In his view, it would be incorrect to perceive the Sarts in the early 20th century merely as "settled Uzbeks", although the difference between Sarts and Uzbeks was often blurred and varied from region to region.

From the mid-1920s until the 1940s, very little was written about the Sarts. In 1941, the Soviet Orientalist A. Yu. Yakubovsky published in Tashkent the pamphlet On the Question of the Ethnogenesis of the Uzbek People, in which he presented his theory of Uzbek ethnogenesis, which was supported in 1943 by the Soviet archaeologist S. P. Tolstov. According to this theory, the Uzbek nation had developed since ancient times in the territory it currently occupies. Yakubovsky argued that the nomadic Uzbeks were merely the final ethnic component of a population that had gradually formed in Transoxiana and other settled regions of Central Asia, and that only the name of the new conquerors "was transferred" to the existing population.

This idea was adopted in all general histories of Uzbekistan both under Soviet rule and in independent Uzbekistan. According to this theory, the Sarts were to be regarded as one of the constituent elements of the modern Uzbek nation. This was done in the book by the historian Mavlyan Vakhabov, The Formation of the Uzbek Socialist Nation, published in Tashkent in 1961. Within this paradigm, Vakhabov wrote: "...the original core, the ancient stratum of the Uzbek people ... was called Turks until the 16th century, while part of the Turks living in cities later acquired the name Sarts". He also wrote: "...in the 13th century there were large settlements and cities in Fergana with a Turkic population that received the name Sarts after the 16th century".

In the 1958 book Ethnography of the Peoples of the USSR, on general ethnography, Sergey Tokarev wrote that the term Sart "acquired a very indefinite meaning in ethnographic literature and caused considerable confusion". He also regarded the Sarts as a class-social rather than ethnic group and considered the term Sart to have a "chauvinistic and contemptuous connotation".

According to Bregel, Sarts were often treated inadequately in Western historical literature of the 1960s and 1970s. Thus Edward Allworth in his 1964 book Uzbek Literary Politics called Sarts "urban Uzbeks". Karl Menges in his 1967 book Central Asia: A Century of Russian Rule described them as "the settled urban population of Central Asia" and as "a derogatory nickname for urban inhabitants". (Note: Karl Menges stated: "The settled urban population of Central Asia was also called Sarts, and this term is widely encountered in literature published before 1917. After 1917 it fell out of use because it was used by nomadic populations—both Uzbeks and Kazakhs—as a derogatory nickname for urban inhabitants, regardless of their Turkic or Iranian affiliation (Uzbeks, New Uyghurs, or Tajiks)." Menges, Karl H. "People, Languages, and Migrations." In Edward Allworth (ed.), Central Asia: 120 Years of Russian Rule. 3rd ed. Durham, North Carolina: Duke University Press, 1994, p. 73.)

Bertold Spuler in his 1966 work Geschichte Mittelasiens: Handbuch der Orientalistik described them as "Turkic-speaking merchants". In 1971, Baimyrza Hayit in his book Turkestan between Russia and China even denied the existence of the Sarts as an ethnic group and stated that "the Sart people and Sart language" were an artificial concept deliberately used by Russians "for the gradual destruction of Turkestan's national consciousness". Western literature also tended to treat Sarts exclusively as urban inhabitants and completely ignore Sart agriculturalists, as did Ingeborg Baldauf in 1991, who described them as "urban population without tribal affiliation".

In the 1970s, new information about the Sarts appeared in both Soviet and Western scholarly literature, based on ethnographic expeditions on the one hand and new research into written sources on the other. Field research conducted over several years by the Khorezm Archaeological and Ethnographic Expedition of the USSR Academy of Sciences showed that the Uzbek-speaking population of southern Khwarazm used the term "Sart" as a self-designation and was known by this name to the population of northern Khwarazm. Other field ethnographic research conducted by Balkis Karmysheva in the central and eastern regions of Uzbekistan and published in her work Essays on the Ethnic History of the Southern Regions of Tajikistan and Uzbekistan showed that in these areas the term "Sart" was unknown or unused, while the Turkic-speaking settled population of these regions used "Chaghatay" as a self-designation.

In the mid-1970s, Bregel conducted research into the meaning of the term "Sart" in Khwarazm and the changing social and political role of the Sarts in the Khanate of Khiva during the 18th and 19th centuries. The results were published in 1978 in the article The Sarts in the Khanate of Khiva.

In 1991, Ingeborg Baldauf discussed the meaning and use of the term "Sart" in her work Some Thoughts on the Making of the Uzbek Nation. She described how the term was defined by various scholars and politicians after the revolution and how it was ultimately rejected. In her view, defining nationality by language during the census forced the authorities, alongside the creation of the pseudo-nation "Sarts", to create a pseudo-language, "Sart", which in turn prompted Russian specialists to write grammars and dictionaries of the Sart language. However, according to Baldauf, although Ostroumov's "Sart language" was a farsighted project from the perspective of cultural planning, the experiment was doomed to fail.

In 1993, the ethnographer O. M. Bronnikova published an article entitled Sarts in the Ethnic History of Central Asia (Towards the Formulation of the Problem), which provided a brief overview of opinions expressed only by Russian authors before and after 1917 up to the time of writing. According to Bregel, this work contributed nothing new to the study of the subject.

In 1998, Adeeb Khalid published the book The Politics of Muslim Cultural Reform: Jadidism in Central Asia, which addressed the subject of the Sarts and provided an overview of scholarly and non-scholarly literature. According to Bregel, Khalid, "while giving more or less detailed summaries of opinions on the Sarts expressed by some pre-revolutionary experts, not only failed to add anything of his own to the subject but also considerably confused the existing picture".

Khalid considered the term "Sart" not to have been an ethnonym. In his book he wrote: "...For unclear reasons, after the conquest of Central Asia, the term 'Sart' became the most commonly used term among Russians for the settled population. ... A German geographer wrote in 1914: 'In colloquial and everyday life, Russians use "Sart" roughly as British colonists would speak of "negroes". It was used for each and every "native" whose clothing did not distinguish them from the general population (Jews, Turkmens, Kirghiz) and who were certainly not foreigners (Europeans, Afghans, Chinese, Indians, and so forth)'".

In 2007, the ethnographer S. N. Abashin published the book Nationalisms in Central Asia: In Search of Identity, with a chapter entitled "The Sart Problem in 19th-Century and Early 20th-Century Russian Historiography". According to Bregel, it provided "an excellent and comprehensive overview of how the problem of the ethnic affiliation of the Sarts was addressed in Russian-language literature up to the mid-1920s".

=== Works by authors from the post-Soviet states of Central Asia ===
The collapse of the USSR in 1991 and the emergence of independent states in Central Asia revived interest in the "Sart problem". The "Sart problem" became a convenient pretext for rewriting history and attempting to make political and moral claims.

Contemporary discussion of the "Sart problem" reproduces the debate of the late 19th and early 20th centuries. Some researchers (A. Koichiev) regard the Sarts as a distinct ethnic community, others (R. Masov and A. Mirbabaev) identify the Sarts as Tajiks, while others (P. D. Shozimov, N. Tursunov (Note: According to the Tajik ethnographer N. Tursunov, the word "Sart" was not an ethnonym but a term defining the economic and cultural status of the population. Tursunov, N. O. The Development of Urban and Rural Settlements in Northern Tajikistan in the 18th–Early 20th Centuries. Dushanbe, 1991, p. 52.)) consider the Sarts to have been a social rather than ethnic group. According to Abashin, references to the Sarts by Kyrgyz and especially Tajik scholars have an "anti-Uzbek" purpose. Their attempt to separate the history of the Sarts from that of the Uzbeks calls into question the very concept of the "Uzbek nation", and therefore the territorial configuration of the "national republics" established in the 1920s. Uzbek researchers instead adopted a strategy of "silence", implying that the Sarts were exclusively part of the Uzbek people and that this should not be a subject of dispute.

Tajik historiography. Tajik scholars paid considerable attention to the Sarts in the early 2000s. For them, the "Sart problem" became one of the grounds for debating who the "Tajiks" were and for interpreting the national delimitation of the 1920s as an injustice committed against Central Asian Tajiks and as a continuation of the aggression of Uzbek newcomers against the indigenous Iranian-speaking Tajik population.

Soviet Tajik historian R. Masov, in his 2003 book The Tajiks: Dispossession and Assimilation, wrote that the Sarts were a "mixed nationality" that arose "from the merging" of Iranian-speaking populations with Turkic-Mongol "newcomers", with "Tajik blood being much more prevalent among the Sarts". He had previously written that "essentially, Sarts were not only Turkic-Tajik metis, but the absolute majority of the Sart population consisted precisely of Tajiks who, for a number of objective and subjective circumstances, had forgotten the Tajik language and their ethnic origin".

In 2002, Soviet Tajik researcher A. Mirbabaev, in his work On the Term "Sart" as a Synonym of the Ethnonym "Tajik", noted that Soviet historiography had passed over the Sart question in silence. In his view, in the 15th–17th centuries the term "Sart" was applied to Tajiks, "especially to the urban trading and artisan stratum, in whose hands spiritual authority was also concentrated". He also stated that "Sarts are Tajiks, not Uzbeks and Kyrgyz", and that the "Sart language" consisted of "Tajik words" mixed with "Uzbek dialects". Sarts-Tajiks interacted with Turks, and therefore "developed bilingualism"; the "process of Sartisation of Uzbeks, Kyrgyz, Turks, Kurama, and other Turkic tribes of Central Asia, especially the Fergana Valley, occurred rather late, at the end of the 19th and beginning of the 20th century" and was associated with the arrival of the Russians and "the establishment of peace and tranquillity in the region". Mirbabaev further wrote that in the 1920s the authorities ordered the replacement of the term "Sart" with "Uzbeks", after which the two concepts "were merged into one". The Tajik scholar called the attempt "to regard the Sarts as a separate ethnic group" a "misconception".

The subject of the Sarts was also addressed in the book Tajik Identity and State-Building in Tajikistan by the Soviet Tajik scholar and specialist in social philosophy P. D. Shozimov, published in 2003, and later in his doctoral dissertation of the same name, defended in 2006. In his view, "the key to understanding both Tajik and Uzbek identity" lies in the "various interpretations" of this term. These interpretations give rise to complex contradictions: "If the criteria for defining Tajik identity are language—Tajik (Persian)—and way of life—settled, then Sarts, according to most researchers, possess the same characteristics. By what criteria, then, does Tajik identity differ from Sart identity?" Conversely, if Sarts are settled Uzbeks, how do settled Uzbeks differ from Tajiks? The author proposes resolving the Sart problem "not by considering it [the term 'Sarts'] as a constant ethnic or social unit, but through the parameter of changes in its meaning during different historical periods". According to Shozimov, "the difference between Tajik and Sart identities was not so much linguistic as stratificational".

Kyrgyz historiography. In 2001, Kyrgyz historian and statesman Arslan Koichiev addressed the subject of the Sarts in his book National-Territorial Delimitation in the Fergana Valley (1924–1927). In his view, the Sarts, the ancient inhabitants of the region, were "one of the major Turkic-speaking ethnic groups leading a settled way of life", originating from the mixing of Iranian groups and tribes, including Eastern Iranian ones, with Turkic groups and tribes, including Kyrgyz in the latter case. "In the process of ethnic formation," the author continued, "the Sarts underwent substantial changes, and the name 'Sart' came to designate only a Turkic-speaking people, indicating that its formation had been completed." At the time of national delimitation, "the fate of the Sarts became a political instrument in the hands of various forces"; the Bolsheviks and "Pan-Turkists" decided to use the Sarts as the basis for forming a "Turkic community" under the new name "Uzbeks". According to Abashin, although the author does not state this directly, his use of the "Sart" issue implies that the national delimitation of the 1920s benefited Uzbekistan at the expense of neighbouring republics.

Uzbek historiography. According to Abashin, the subject of the Sarts was tacitly prohibited in Uzbek historiography. The question of the "Sarts", according to many local scholars, was and remains artificial, introduced into the region from outside with explicit political purposes. A. A. Askarov, former director of the Institute of History of the Academy of Sciences of the Republic of Uzbekistan and an archaeologist by training, expressed the Uzbek position on the issue unambiguously in his 1997 work Some Questions in the History of the Formation of Uzbek Statehood: "Until the 1920s, proponents of the Indo-European concept, characteristic particularly of Russian Oriental studies, understood the term 'Uzbek' to refer only to the Shaybanid Uzbeks, while not recognising the local Uzbek-speaking population (the so-called 'Sarts'—the ancient indigenous Turkic-speaking population of Transoxiana and Khwarazm), although the term 'Uzbek' encompassed both parts of the Uzbek people".

In 2011, the volume Uzbeks was published in the book series Peoples and Cultures, issued by the Institute of Ethnology and Anthropology of the Russian Academy of Sciences together with specialised institutes of the respective countries. It was written mainly by staff of the Institute of History of the Academy of Sciences of the Republic of Uzbekistan. This fundamental work reflects the position of Uzbek scholars on ethnic and ethnodemographic questions concerning the formation of the Uzbek nation, including the "Sart problem". According to this position, at the beginning of the 20th century the Uzbek people consisted of three ethnic substrates: (1) Sarts; (2) ethnic unions of Turks whose roots went back to the medieval period (Turk, Qarluq, Qangli, Qipchaq); and (3) Dasht-i Qipchaq Uzbeks, who numbered more than 100 clans and tribes. Regarding the Sarts, Z. Kh. Arifkhanova writes: "As a result of the prolonged process of ethnic rapprochement and cultural-economic interaction between steppe nomads and inhabitants of agricultural oases, between ancient Iranian-speaking and Turkic-speaking peoples, an ethnic stratum of the Central Asian interfluve emerged that absorbed elements of two worlds—the Turkic and Iranian-Sogdian. The descendants of this population were often called Sarts".

=== Modern research ===
The French Orientalist Olivier Roy defines Sarts as a settled, non-tribal group of rural inhabitants bound together by cultural ties regardless of language. The Canadian Iranist Richard Foltz defined Sarts as the settled urban population of Central Asia, contrasting them with nomads, and noted that before the 20th century they were predominantly Persian-speaking, while at the turn of the 19th and 20th centuries they became bilingual, speaking a highly Persianised form of Turkic. (Note: The Canadian historian Richard Foltz gives the following definition of the Sarts: Central Asia's bilingual city folk were most often referred to as "Sarts", a somewhat pejorative term that had been in use for centuries and implied that one was a Persian-speaker. By the turn of the twentieth century, however, the sense was no longer linguistic, since Sarts typically spoke both languages interchangeably. When they spoke Turkī (more often referred to as Turkestānī), it was in a highly Persianized form that drew the disdain of Kazakhs, Qara-Qyrgyz and Turkmen who remained proudly attached to their rural, nomadic lifestyles and values—an echo of the prejudice shown by Maḥmūd of Kashgar towards "Sogdianized" urban Turks a millennium before. At the same time, the Tojikī dialect had been diverging from standard Persian through the adoption of Turkic vocabulary and syntax, and, now, with an infusion of neologisms from Russian as well. The use of the term "Sarts" is also recorded in earlier sources. The Timurid poet Ali-Shir Nava'i in the 15th century referred to the Tajiks as the "Sart nation" (Sart ulusï), while several decades later Babur used the term both for the Tajiks of Fergana and for the inhabitants of Kabul. The term is presumably derived from the Sanskrit sārthavāha, "merchant" or "caravan leader"; cf. the Chinese term for the head of the Sogdians, sabao. The Timurid poet Alisher Navoi in the fifteenth century refers to the Tajiks as the "Sart nation" (Sart ulusï) and a few decades later Babur uses the term to refer to the Tajiks of Ferghana as well as to the residents of Kabul. The term likely derives from the Sanskrit sarthavaha, "merchant" or "caravan leader"; cf. the Chinese term for the head of the Sogdians, sabao.) The American Orientalist Scott Levi defines the term "Sart" as a social category referring to settled agriculturalists, whether Turks or Tajiks, in contrast to nomadic Turkic tribes.

In 2000, an analysis of debates about the Sarts in the interpretations of I. Zarubin, A. Samoylovich, and others appeared in a study by the American historian Francine Hirsch.

In 2001, the Orientalist philologist Paolo Sartori reached a different conclusion, arguing that the term "Sart" was used as an ethnonym in the Zeravshan Valley and the territory of the Emirate of Bukhara.

In 2002, the sociologist A. Ilkhamov used the term "Sart" as an ethnonym in the Ethnic Atlas of Uzbekistan. This provoked a new round of controversy, which Bregel commented on in his 2008 article as follows: "Neither Ilkhamov nor other participants in the disputes that he provoked contributed anything new to the question of the ethnicity of the Sarts and their role in the history of the Uzbeks". (Note: "Neither Ilkhamov nor other participants in the disputes that he provoked contributed anything new to the question of the ethnicity of the Sarts and their role in the history of the Uzbeks." Quoted from Bregel, Yu. "Recent Publications on the Sarts: A Review Article." Journal of Asian History 42, no. 2 (2008), p. 205.)

In 2007, Kazakh researchers argued that "if an individual was born thousands of miles away but nomadises among the Kazakhs, he is a nomad, he is a Kazakh. If his parents are Kazakhs but he lives in the city of Isfijab, he is a Sart. He is not a Kazakh. Only a nomadic nomad was a Kazakh". Soviet Kazakh historian Nurbulat Masanov defines Sarts as a settled population. (Note: Central Asia had a bipolar economic and cultural system. At one pole were nomads; at the other was the settled agricultural population. The latter was divided linguistically: Iranian-speaking groups were Tats, Taziks, and Tajiks; Turkic-speaking groups were Sarts.)

In 2008, the Russian ethnologist S. Abashin defended a dissertation on the Sarts of Central Asia. According to his concept, before the arrival of the Russian Empire, "society lacked boundaries that could have been used to delineate groups by attaching to them an 'ethnic' label. It was only with the arrival of Russia in Central Asia that more or less stable identities emerged". He believed that the selection of the terms "Uzbek", "Uyghur", "Tajik", and others as national names in Central Asia was largely arbitrary.

The term "Sart" was used as an offensive word during the Osh conflicts of 1990 and 2010.

Oxford University Professor M. Reeves emphasised in 2014 that although the term "Sart" had long disappeared from official use as a statistical category, the word continues to have social significance to this day as a derogatory term for "Uzbeks".

== Sources ==
- Abashin, Sergey (2004). "The Population of the Fergana Valley: Toward the Formation of Ethnographic Nomenclature in the Late 19th and Early 20th Centuries". The Fergana Valley: Ethnicity, Ethnic Processes, and Ethnic Conflicts. Moscow: Nauka; Institute of Ethnology and Anthropology named after N. N. Miklukho-Maklay, Russian Academy of Sciences. pp. 38–102.
- Abashin, Sergey (2007). "The Problem of the Sarts in 19th-Century and Early 20th-Century Russian Historiography". Nationalisms in Central Asia: In Search of Identity. Saint Petersburg: Alateya; Institute of Ethnology and Anthropology named after N. N. Miklukho-Maklay, Russian Academy of Sciences. pp. 95–176.
- Abashin, Sergey (2008). "The National Classification of the Population of Central Asia". Central Asia within the Russian Empire. The Peripheries of the Russian Empire. Moscow: Nauka; European University at Saint Petersburg; New Literary Observer. pp. 259–277.
- Abashin, Sergey (2009). "The Return of the Sarts? Methodology and Ideology in Post-Soviet Academic Debates". Anthropological Forum (10). Museum of Anthropology and Ethnography (Kunstkamera), Russian Academy of Sciences: 252–278.
- Abashin, Sergey (2016). ""The Sarts — a People with a Future": Ethnography and Empire in Russian Turkestan". Orientalism vs. Oriental Studies. Islamica & Orientalistica. Moscow: Sadra; Institute of Oriental Studies, Russian Academy of Sciences; Foundation for Research of Islamic Culture. pp. 207–234.
- Alimova, Dilora; Rashidova, D. (1998). Mahmudhoja Behbudi and His Historical Views. Tashkent: Ma'naviyat. p. 40.
- Arifkhanova, Zoya (2011). "Ethnic Composition of the Population". In Arifkhanova, Z. Kh.; Abashin, S. N.; Alimova, D. A. (eds.). Uzbeks. Peoples and Culture. Moscow: Nauka; Institute of Ethnology and Anthropology named after N. N. Miklukho-Maklay, Russian Academy of Sciences; Institute of History, Academy of Sciences of the Republic of Uzbekistan. pp. 50–53.
- Babajanov, Bakhtiyar (2010). The Kokand Khanate: Power, Politics, and Religion. Tashkent; Tokyo: Institute of Oriental Studies, Academy of Sciences of the Republic of Uzbekistan. p. 744.
- Barthold, Vasily (1963). "Tajiks: A Historical Sketch". Works on the History of Central Asia. Vol. II(1). Moscow: Nauka; Main Editorial Office of Oriental Literature. pp. 449–469.
- Barthold, Vasily (1963). "Turkestan under Islam". History of the Cultural Life of Turkestan. Vol. II(1). Moscow: Nauka; Main Editorial Office of Oriental Literature. pp. 194–238.
- Barthold, Vasily (1964). "Sart". Works on Particular Problems in the History of Central Asia. Vol. II(2). Moscow: Nauka; Main Editorial Office of Oriental Literature. pp. 527–529.
- Bogoyavlensky, Nikolai (1906). Western China Beyond the Wall: Its Past, Present Condition, and the Position of Russian Subjects There. Saint Petersburg: A. S. Suvorin Printing House. p. 418.
- Beisembiev, Timur (1987). Tārīkh-i Shahrūkhī as a Historical Source. Alma-Ata: Nauka, Kazakh SSR; Institute of History and Ethnology named after Ch. Ch. Valikhanov, Academy of Sciences of the Kazakh SSR. p. 200.
- Beisembiev, Timur (2009). Kokand Historiography: A Study in the Source Criticism of 18th- and 19th-Century Central Asia. Almaty: Print-S. p. 1263.
- Bushkov, V. I.; Tolstova, Lada S. (2001). "The Population of Central Asia and Kazakhstan: An Outline of Ethnic History". Peoples: Collection. Races and Peoples. Vol. 27. Moscow: Nauka; Institute of Ethnology and Anthropology named after N. N. Miklukho-Maklay, Russian Academy of Sciences. pp. 141–167.
- Vambery, Arminius (2003). Journey through Central Asia. Stories about the Countries of the East. Moscow: Vostochnaya Literatura, Russian Academy of Sciences; Institute of Oriental Studies, Russian Academy of Sciences. p. 320.
- Vakhabov, Mavlyan G. (1961). The Formation of the Uzbek Socialist Nation. Tashkent: State Publishing House of the Uzbek SSR. p. 587.
- Dmitriev, S. V. (2024-03-19). "Uyghurs". Great Russian Encyclopedia. Archived from the original on 2 February 2024.
- Karmysheva, Balkis (1976). Essays on the Ethnic History of the Southern Regions of Tajikistan and Uzbekistan: Based on Ethnographic Data. Moscow: Nauka; Institute of Ethnography named after N. N. Miklukho-Maklay, Academy of Sciences of the USSR. p. 322.
- Klyashtorny, Sergey; Kolesnikov, Alexander A. (1988). Eastern Turkestan through the Eyes of Russian Travelers: The Second Half of the 19th Century. Alma-Ata: Nauka; Institute of Uyghur Studies, Academy of Sciences of the Kazakh SSR. p. 224.
- Kotyukova, T. V. (2014). "The "Other" World through the Eyes of "Our Own" in the Turkestan Native Newspaper". Eastern Archive. 2 (30). Institute of Oriental Studies, Russian Academy of Sciences: 144–152.
- Lyushkevich, F. D. (1971). "The Term "Tat" as an Ethnonym in Central Asia, Iran, and the Caucasus". Soviet Ethnography (3). Institute of Ethnography named after N. N. Miklukho-Maklay, Academy of Sciences of the USSR: 25–32.
- Masanov, Nurbulat E.; Abylkhozhin, Zhulduzbek B.; Erofeeva, Irina V. (2007). Scientific Knowledge and Mythmaking in the Contemporary Historiography of Kazakhstan. Alma-Ata: Daik-Press; Friedrich Ebert Stiftung. p. 177.
- Nabiev, Rashid (1973). From the History of the Kokand Khanate: The Feudal Economy of Khudayar Khan. Tashkent: Fan, Uzbek SSR; Institute of Oriental Studies named after Abu Rayhan al-Biruni, Academy of Sciences of the Uzbek SSR. p. 388.
- Ostroumov, Nikolai (1908). Sarts: Ethnographic Materials. Tashkent: Printing House of the Newspaper Sredneaziatskaya zhizn. p. 288.
- Ochir, Ayuudain (2016). Mongolian Ethnonyms: Questions of the Origin and Ethnic Composition of the Mongolian Peoples. Elista: Kalmyk Institute for Humanities Research, Russian Academy of Sciences; International Institute for the Study of Nomadic Civilizations, Academy of Sciences of Mongolia. p. 286.
- Pashino, P. I. (1868). The Turkestan Region in 1866: Travel Notes (in Russian). Saint Petersburg. p. 176.
- Troynitsky, N., ed. (1905). Distribution of the Population by the Principal Social Estates, Religions, Native Languages, and Certain Occupations: Brief General Information on the Empire. First General Census of the Russian Empire, 1897. Saint Petersburg: N. L. Nyrkin Steam Printing and Lithography House. p. 43.
- Rassudova, R. (2012). "The Yellow Dog: Toward the History of the Ethnonyms of the Population of the Northern Syr Darya and Southern Kazakhstan". Bestiary II: Zoomorphisms of Asia: Movement through Time. Saint Petersburg: Russian Academy of Sciences, Museum of Anthropology and Ethnography (Kunstkamera) named after Peter the Great. pp. 84–90.
- "Sarts". Great Soviet Encyclopedia. Vol. 22. 1975. p. 603.
- "Sarts". Encyclopaedic Dictionary of Brockhaus and Efron. Vol. XXVIIIa.
- Faizrakhmanov, L. M. (2008). "N. P. Ostroumov: Missionary and Islamic Scholar". Izvestia of Altai State University (4–1): 146–150.
- Khalid, A. (2022). Making Uzbekistan: Nation, Empire, and Revolution in the Early Soviet Period. Contemporary Western Rusistika. Boston; Saint Petersburg: Academic Studies Press; Bibliorossica. p. 623.
- Shaniyazov, Karim (2011). "Ethnic Processes in the Medieval Period". Uzbeks. Peoples and Culture. Moscow: Nauka; Institute of Ethnology and Anthropology named after N. N. Miklukho-Maklay, Russian Academy of Sciences; Institute of History, Academy of Sciences of the Republic of Uzbekistan. pp. 39–50.
- Baldauf, Ingeborg (1991). "Some Thoughts on the Making of the Uzbek Nation". Cahiers du Monde russe et soviétique. 32 (1): 79–96. doi:10.3406/cmr.1991.2264.
- Barthold, W.; Subtelny, Maria E. (1997). "SĀRT". The Encyclopaedia of Islam. Vol. IX (New ed.). Leiden: E. J. Brill. pp. 66–67.
- Bregel, Yuri (1978). "The Sarts in the Khanate of Khiva". Journal of Asian History. 12 (2): 120–151.
- Bregel, Yuri (2008). "Recent Publications on the Sarts: A Review Article". Journal of Asian History. 42 (2): 196–206.
- Khalid, Adeeb (1998). The Politics of Muslim Cultural Reform: Jadidism in Central Asia. Berkeley; Los Angeles; London: University of California Press. p. 336.
- Levy, Scott C. (2017). The Rise and Fall of Khoqand, 1709–1876: Central Asia in the Global Age. Central Eurasia in Context Series. Pittsburgh: University of Pittsburgh Press. p. 258.
- Roy, Olivier (2000). The New Central Asia: The Creation of Nations. The Medieval World. New York: New York University Press. p. 244.
- Subtelny, Maria E. (1994). "The Symbiosis of Turk and Tajik". In Manz, Beatrice Forbes (ed.). Central Asia in Historical Perspective. Boulder; San Francisco; Oxford: Westview Press. pp. 44–60.
- Bronnikova, O. M. (1993). "Sarts in the Ethnic History of Central Asia: Toward the Formulation of the Problem". Ethnic Groups and Ethnic Processes: In Memory of R. F. Its. Moscow.
- Menges, Karl H. (1994). "People, Languages, and Migrations". In Allworth, Edward (ed.). Central Asia: 120 Years of Russian Rule (3rd ed.). Durham, North Carolina: Duke University Press. pp. 71–98.
- Sartori, Paolo (2001). "L'etnonimo sārt e gli affanni etnografici russi in Turkestan". Letterature di Frontiera – Littératures Frontalières (in Italian). 11 (1): 161–175.
- Owen Lattimore. (1973) "Return to China's Northern Frontier." The Geographical Journal, Vol. 139, No. 2 (Jun., 1973), pp. 233–242.
- Ostroumov, Nikolai Petrovich (1884), Значение Названия "Сарт", Tashkent
- Ostroumov, Nikolai Petrovich (1890), Сарты – Этнографические Материалы, Tashkent, p. 7
- Barthold, W. & Subtelny, M.E. (1997). "Sārt". In Bosworth, C. E.; van Donzel, E.; Heinrichs, W. P. & Lecomte, G. (eds.). The Encyclopaedia of Islam, Second Edition. Volume IX: San–Sze. Leiden: E. J. Brill. ISBN 978-90-04-10422-8.
- Breel, Yuri (1978), "The Sarts in the Khanate of Khiva", Journal of Asian History, vol. 12, Wiesbaden: O. Harrassowitz, pp. 121–151, ISSN 0021-910X
- Subtelny, Maria Eva (1994), "The Symbiosis of Turk and Tajik", in Manz, Beatrice (ed.), Central Asia in historical perspective, The John M. Olin critical issues series, Boulder CO USA: Westview Press, ISBN 0-8133-8801-5
- Nava'i, Ali Shir; Devereaux, Robert (1966), Muhakamat al-Lughatayn, Leiden: Brill
- Arat, Reşit Rahmeti (1947), Kutadgu bilig, Türk Dil Kurumu, vol. 87, Istanbul: Millî Eğitim Basımevi, p. 571
- Thackston, Wheeler (2002), The Baburnama : memoirs of Babur, prince and emperor, New York: The Modern Library, pp. 5, 156, ISBN 0-375-76137-3
- Ṭabīb, Rashīd al-Dīn; Thackston, Wheeler (1978), Rashiduddin Fazlullah's Jamiʻuʾt-tawarikh = Compendium of chronicles, Sources of Oriental languages and literatures, vol. 4, Cambridge MA USA: Harvard University, Department of Near Eastern Languages and Civilizations, p. 78
- Foltz, Richard (2019). A History of the Tajiks: Iranians of the East. New York: Bloomsbury Publishing. ISBN 978-1784539559.
- Levi, Scott C. (2017). The Rise and Fall of Khoqand, 1709 – 1876: Central Asia in the Global Age. University of Pittsburgh.
- Roy, Olivier (2000). The New Central Asia: Geopolitics and the Birth of Nations. New York University Press. ISBN 978-0814775554.
- Perry, John R. (2009). "Tajik i. The Ethnonym: Origins and Application". Encyclopaedia Iranica.
- McDowell, Christopher (2012). "'Death to Sarts': History, injustice and a complex insult in Central Asia" (PDF). Anthropology Today. 28 (6): 22–24. doi:10.1111/j.1467-8322.2012.00913.x.
- Khalid, Adeeb (2015). Making Uzbekistan: Nation, Empire, and Revolution in the Early USSR. Ithaca and London: Cornell University Press. ISBN 978-0-8014-5409-7.
