= Tarikh-i Jadidah-yi Tashkand =

1886 Persian chronicle

The Tarikh-i Jadidah-yi Tashkand (Persian: تاریخ جدیدۀ تاشکند) is a Persian chronicle about the Khanate of Kokand, composed in 1886 by Muhammad Salih Khwaja Tashkandi, a teacher in a traditional school. It is both the longest and last large chronicle about the Khanate of Kokand.

== History ==
Tashkandi had started writing the chronicle in 1862, but by the time it was completed, the Russian Empire had conquered the Khanate of Kokand. The first volume of the chronicle, which makes up less than one-third of its content, presents a general history mostly drawn from older sources. In contrast, the second volume offers a more important account, focusing on the history of Tashkent, Ferghana, and the Khanate of Kokand, alongside an extensive description of the Russian conquest. The Tarikh-i Jadidah-yi Tashkand is amongst the many Persian historical works from Central Asia that has not received its own edition.

== Sources ==
- Bregel, Yuri (2020). "Historiography vi. Central Asia". Encyclopaedia Iranica Online. Brill. doi:10.1163/2330-4804_EIRO_COM_3101.
- Morrison, Alexander (2021). The Russian Conquest of Central Asia: A Study in Imperial Expansion, 1814–1914. Cambridge University Press. ISBN 978-1107030305.
