= Tarikh-i Shahrukhi =

1871/1872 Persian chronicle

The Tarikh-i Shahrukhi (Persian: تاریخ شاهرخی) is a Persian chronicle about the Khanate of Kokand, composed in 1871/72 by Niaz-Muhammad ibn Ashur-Muhammad Khoqani under the orders of Muhammad Khudayar Khan (r. 1845–1875). The Russians were aware of the chronicle, which served as the inspiration for their first historical writing about the Khanate of Kokand. It is amongst the few Persian historical works from Central Asia that are available in text editions. However, the Russian American historian Yuri Bregel considered it to be "a very poor edition, without scholarly apparatus".

== Sources ==
- Bregel, Yuri (2020). "Historiography vi. Central Asia". Brill. doi:10.1163/2330-4804_EIRO_COM_3101.
- Morrison, Alexander (2021). The Russian Conquest of Central Asia: A Study in Imperial Expansion, 1814–1914. Cambridge University Press. ISBN 978-1107030305.
