= Ethnic clashes in southern Kyrgyzstan =

Ethnic clashes in southern Kyrgyzstan may refer to:

- 1990 Osh clashes or Osh riots, inter-ethnic clashes that took place between Kyrgyz and Uzbeks in Southern Kyrgyzstan in 1990
- 2010 South Kyrgyzstan ethnic clashes or June pogroms, inter-ethnic clashes that took place between Kyrgyz and Uzbeks in Southern Kyrgyzstan in 2010

== See also ==
- Osh riots (disambiguation)
