= Osh riots =

Osh riots may refer to:

- Osh riots (1990)
- 2010 South Kyrgyzstan ethnic clashes

== See also ==
- Ethnic clashes in southern Kyrgyzstan (disambiguation)
