= Yuri Bregel =

Latvian military historian (1925–2016)

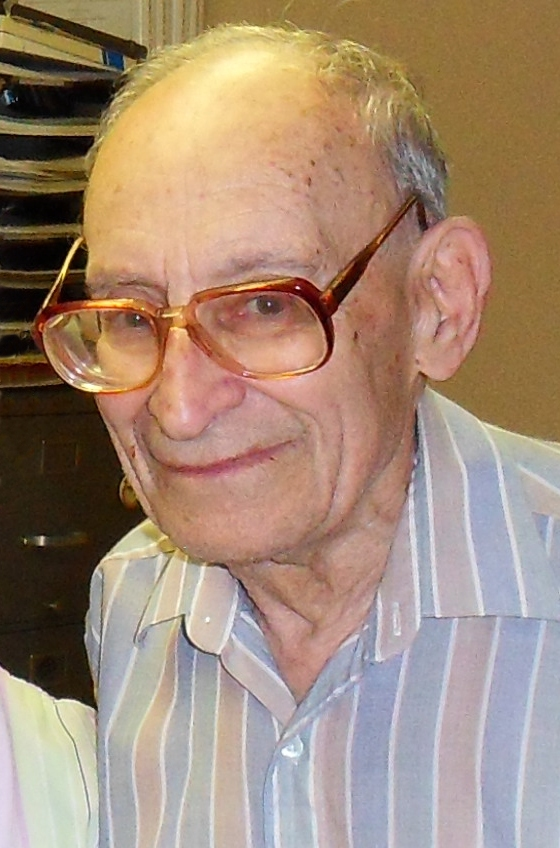
- Bregel in SRIFIAS library in Goodbody Hall at Indiana University, Bloomington in May 2010.
- Born: Yuri Enohovich Bregel; 13 November 1925; Moscow, Russia
- Died: 7 August 2016 (aged 90); Belmont, Massachusetts, U.S.
- Education: Ph.D., Institute of Oriental Studies, Moscow
- Occupation: Professor
- Spouse: Liliya "Liusia" Bregel (m. 1924–2009)

Yuri Enohovich Bregel (Russian: Юрий Энохович Брегель; 13 November 1925 – 7 August 2016) was one of the world's leading historians of Islamic Central Asia. He published extensively on Persian- and Turkic-language history and historiography, and on political, economic and ethnic history in Central Asia and the Muslim world. He lived in the Soviet Union (1925–1974), Israel (1974–1981), and the United States (1981–2016).

== Biography ==
=== Soviet Union ===
Yuri Bregel was born in Moscow, the son of Enoch Bregel (1903–1993), a noted Soviet political economist. When he was sixteen years old, his family relocated to the town of Fergana and in 1943 he joined the Soviet army where he was to serve in an anti-tank artillery unit. He fought in the Crimea, Belorussia, Poland, and Germany; he was injured twice and decorated.

After the war, he enrolled at the History department at Moscow University, where he studied Middle Eastern, Central Asian and Islamic history. In the fall of 1949, Bregel was arrested and imprisoned on charges of "anti-Soviet activity." He spent the next five years in a hard labor camp in the northern Urals. Upon his release, he resumed his studies and earned a doctorate at the Institute of Oriental Studies in Moscow in 1961.

In 1955, Bregel married Liliya (Liusia) Davydovna Rozenberg, then a doctoral student (and later faculty) at Moscow State University and a specialist on the social and administrative history of Portuguese India in the 16th and 17th centuries.

In the 1960s and early 1970s, Yuri Bregel's scholarship had already gained considerable reputation, having worked on the 10-volume collection and republication of Vasily Bartold's works; on the production of the famed Monuments of the Literature of the East (Pamiatniki pis'mennosti Vostoka) series and the Russian translation and significant expansion of Charles Storey's essential, multi-volume Persian Literature. To these endeavors, Bregel added original scholarship on political, economic and ethnic history of 19th-century Khiva and its Turkmen peoples.

=== Israel and United States ===
In 1974, after some effort in his behalf by international colleagues, Bregel and his family were finally allowed to emigrate to Israel. Bregel joined the Hebrew University of Jerusalem, where he became an endowed Chair and Professor of the History of the Muslim Peoples.

In 1981 Bregel moved to the United States, to Bloomington, Indiana, where he joined what was then Indiana University's Department of Uralic and Altaic Studies (later renamed Department of Central Eurasian Studies), augmenting the department's research profile and course offerings in Central Asian history and historiography and in the study of Turkic (Chagatai language) and Persian manuscripts, while also enhancing the Library's holdings of rare primary and secondary sources.

== Positions ==
Bregel served as Director of Indiana University's Research Institute for Inner Asian Studies from 1986 to 1997, and as Director of Indiana University's Inner Asian and Uralic National Resource Center from 1989 to 1997. He served as consulting editor for the Encyclopaedia Iranica Foundation, senior editor for the Oriental Literature Public House in Moscow, a research fellow at the Institute for Oriental Studies of the Academy of Sciences of the Soviet Union, a member of the Institute for Advanced Study in Princeton, and a member of the Association for the Advancement of Central Asian Research and the Association for Central Asian Studies.

== Selected publications ==
Bregel authored numerous publications on the medieval and early modern history of Central Asia, including the 3-volume Bibliography of Islamic Central Asia (1995), the edition and translation of the important Khivan chronicle Firdaws al-iqbal (1988 and 1999) and An Historical Atlas of Central Asia (2003), in addition to serving as editor-in-chief of Papers on Inner Asia and many other publications.

=== Books ===
- Khorezmskie turkmeny v XIX veke, Moscow, 1961.
- Dokumenty arkhiva khivinskikh khanov po istorii i etnografii karakalpakov, Moscow, 1967.
- Ch. A. Stori, Persidskaia literatura: Bio-bibliograficheskii obzor [Russian translation and expansion of C. A. Storey, Persian Literature], vols. I-III, Moscow, 1972.
- Shir Muhammad Mirab Munis and Muhammad Riza Mirab Agahi Firdaws al-Iqbal: History of Khorezm Text Edition. Leiden: Brill, 1988; English translation, 1999.
- Bibliography of Islamic Central Asia (Indiana University Uralic and Altaic Series) 1995 3 Vols.
- Shir Muhammad Mirab Muni's and Muhammad Reza Mirab Agahi, Firdaws al-Iqbal: History of Khorezm translated from the Chaghatay and annotated (Leiden: Brill) 1999.
- An Historical Atlas of Central Asia (Leiden: Brill) 2003.

=== Edited works ===
- Muhammad ibn Nadzhib Bakran, Djhakhan-name (Kniga o mire), ed. Iu. E. Borschevskii (Moscow, 1960).
- Poslovitsy i pogovorki narodov Vostoka, Moscow, 1961.
- V. V. Bartol'd, Sochineniia, vols. I, II/1, II/2, III, V, VII, VIII.

=== Articles, chapters, and papers ===
- “Barthold and Modern Oriental Studies,” International Journal of Middle East Studies 12 (1980), 385–403.
- "The Role of Central Asia in the History of the Muslim East," Asia Society Occasional Papers (Afghanistan Council, 1980)
- “The Sarts in the Khanate of Khiva,” Journal of Asian History 12 (1978), 121–151
- "Nomadic and Sedentary Elements among the Turkmens," Central Asiatic Journal 25/1-2 (1981), 5-37
- "Tribal Tradition and Dynastic History: The Early Rulers of the Qongrats According to Munis" Asian and African Studies 16/3 (1982)
- '"Turko-Mongol Influences in Central Asia" in Turco-Persia in Historical Perspective Ed. R. Canfield (Cambridge University Press) 1991
- Notes on the Study of Central Asia (Papers on Inner Asia 28, 1996)
- The Administration of Bukhara under the Manghits and Some Tashkent Manuscripts (Papers on Inner Asia 34, 2000)

== Bibliography ==
- DeWeese, Devin, ed. (2001). Studies on Central Asian History in honor of Yuri Bregel. Bloomington, Indiana: Indiana University. ISBN 0-933070-48-9.
