= Al-Hariqa =

Coordinates: 33°30′34″N 36°18′7″E

Al-Hariqa (Arabic: الحريقة) is a neighborhood in Damascus, Syria, inside the walls of the old city south of the Citadel of Damascus between the late-Ottoman-era markets of al-Hamidiyah Souq and Medhat Pasha Souq. The neighborhood was known as Sidi Amoud after a religious figure who was buried there. It was called al-Hariqa (Conflagration) after the area was completely burned down in 1925 under French bombing in response to the Great Syrian Revolt. The Nur al-Din Bimaristan (covered into the Museum of Medicine and Science in the Arab World) is in Al-Hariqa.
