= Zengid dynasty =

Historical dynasty of Turkoman origin (12–13th centuries AD)

Zengid Dynasty الدولة الزنكية
- 1127–1174 (with nominal power until 1250)
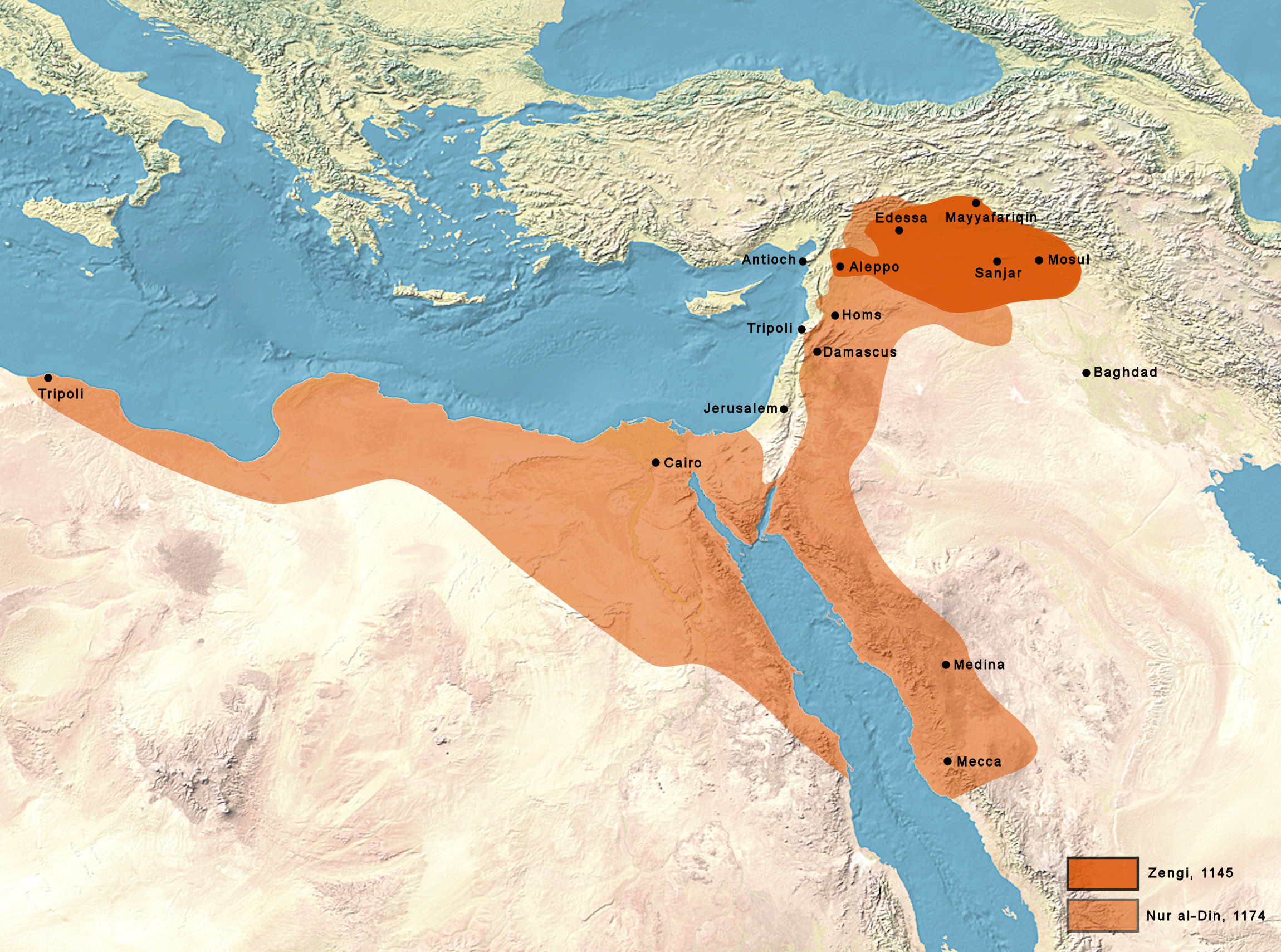
- The Zengid state under Imad al-Din in 1145, and expansion under Nur al-Din in 1174 CE.
- Status: Atabegate of the Seljuk Empire (1127–1194); Emirate (1194–1250)
- Capital: Multiple bases: Mosul (until 1234); Damascus (1154–1174)
- Official languages: Arabic
- Common languages: Arabic (majority, administrative, literary, numismatics); Syriac (Christian populations); Oghuz Turkic (nomads, military elite, rulers).
- Religion: Sunni Islam (majority); Shia Islam (minority)
- Government: Hereditary monarchy
- Sultan
  - 1118–1157: Ahmad Sanjar
  - 1176–1194: Tughril III
- Emir
  - 1127–1146: Imad al-Din Zengi (first)
  - 1241–1250: Mahmud Al-Malik Al-Zahir (last reported)
- History
  - Established: 1127
  - Disestablished: 1174 (with nominal power until 1250)
- Currency: Dinar
Preceded by
Seljuk Empire
County of Edessa
Fatimid Caliphate
Burid dynasty
Succeeded by
Luluids
Ayyubids
Ilkhanate

The Zengid dynasty (Note: Sometimes transliterated as Zangid dynasty, also referred to as the Atabegate of Mosul, Aleppo and Damascus (Arabic: أتابكة الموصل وحلب ودمشق), or the Zengid State; (Arabic: الدولة الزنكية, romanized: al-Dawla al-Zankiyya)) was a Turkoman Sunni Muslim dynasty in the Middle East. Initially an Atabegate of the Seljuk Empire created in 1127, it ruled parts of the Levant and Upper Mesopotamia, and eventually seized control of Fatimid Egypt in 1169. Imad al-Din Zengi was the first ruler of the dynasty. By 1174, the Zengid state extended from Tripoli to Hamadan and from Yemen to Sivas, as it also included the Egyptian territories held by Saladin as governor in the name of Nur al-Din Zengi.

The Zengid Atabegate became famous in the Islamic world for its successes against the Crusader states, and for being the Atabegate from which Saladin would emerge. After the death of his master Nur al-Din in 1174, Saladin successively took Damascus (1174) and Aleppo (1183) from the Zengids, ending their rule in Syria. However he left Mosul under Zengid control, where they met demise in 1234 on the hands of atabeg Badr al-Din Lu'lu'. Following the end of the Seljuk dynasty in 1194, the Zengids persisted for several decades as one of the "Seljuk successor-states" until 1250.

== History ==
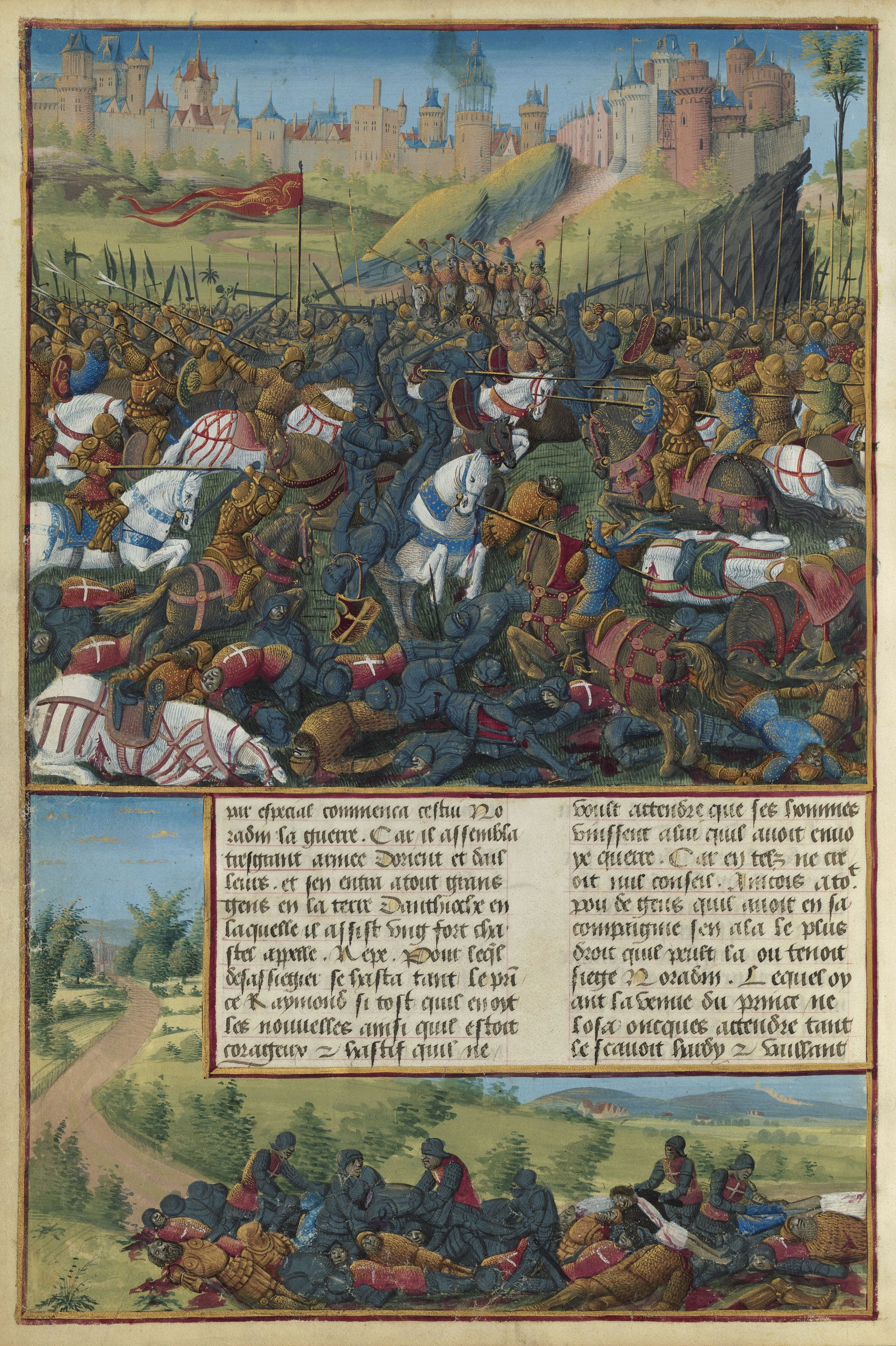
Nūr-ad-Din's victory at the Battle of Inab, 1149. Illustration from the Passages d'outremer, c. 1490.

In 1127, following the murder of Aqsunqur al-Bursuqi, atabeg of Mosul, the Seljuk Empire decided to name Zengi, son of Aq Sunqur al-Hajib, Seljuk Governor of Aleppo, as the new Seljuk atabeg of Mosul. Before this nomination, Zengi had been a successful Seljuk general in Iraq, where he had become shihna, or Governor for the whole region.

Zengi quickly became the chief Turkic potentate in Northern Syria and Iraq, taking Aleppo from the squabbling Artuqids in 1128 and capturing the County of Edessa from the Crusaders after the siege of Edessa in 1144. This latter feat made Zengi a hero in the Muslim world, but he was assassinated by a slave two years later, in 1146. On Zengi's death, his territories were divided, with Mosul and his lands in Iraq going to his eldest son Saif ad-Din Ghazi I, and Aleppo and Edessa falling to his second son, Nur ad-Din, atabeg of Aleppo.

=== Conflict with the Crusaders ===
Nur ad-Din proved to be as competent as his father. In 1146 he defeated the Crusaders at the Siege of Edessa. In 1149, he defeated Raymond of Poitiers, Prince of Antioch, at the battle of Inab, and the next year conquered the remnants of the County of Edessa west of the Euphrates. In 1154, he capped off these successes by his capture of Damascus from the Turkic Burid dynasty that ruled it.

Now ruling from Damascus, Nur ad-Din's success continued. Another Prince of Antioch, Raynald of Châtillon was captured, and the territories of the Principality of Antioch were greatly reduced.

=== Conquests ===
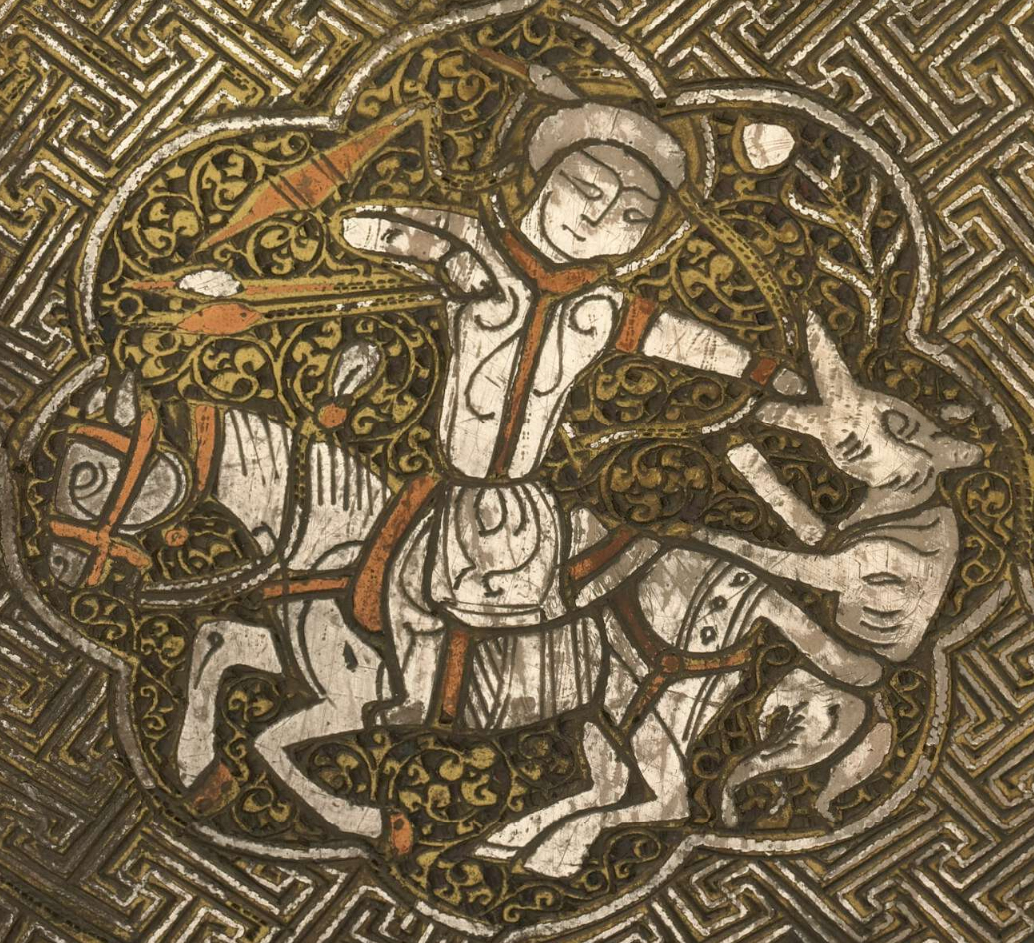
Hunting scene on the Blacas ewer, 1232, Mosul, Zengid dynasty.

After the defeats of the Seljuk Empire in Khorasan and the death of the Seljuk ruler Ahmad Sanjar in 1157, the Zengids remained nominally under Seljuk suzerainty, but in practice became essentially independent.

In the 1160s, Nur ad-Din's attention was mostly held by a competition with the King of Jerusalem, Amalric of Jerusalem, for control of the Fatimid Caliphate in Egypt. From 1163 to 1169, Shirkuh, a military commander in the service of the Zengid dynasty, took part in a series of campaigns in Fatimid Egypt, on the pretext to help the Fatimid vizier Shawar regain his throne from his rival Dirgham, and in opposition to the Crusader invasions of Egypt. In 1164, Latin Patriarch of Antioch Aimery of Limoges sent a letter to King Louis VII of France, in which he described the events in the Crusader States: "[Shirkuh] having gotten possession of Damascus, the latter entered Egypt with a great force of Turks, in order to conquer the country."

In 1163, the vizier to the Fatimid caliph al-Adid, Shawar, had been driven out of Egypt by his rival Dirgham, a member of the powerful Banu Ruzzaik tribe. He asked for military backing from Nur ad-Din, who complied and, in 1164, sent Shirkuh to aid Shawar in his expedition against Dirgham. Shirkuh's nephew Saladin, at age 26, went along with them. After Shawar was successfully reinstated as vizier, he demanded that Shirkuh withdraw his army from Egypt for a sum of 30,000 gold dinars, but Shirkuh refused, insisting it was Nur ad-Din's will that he remain.

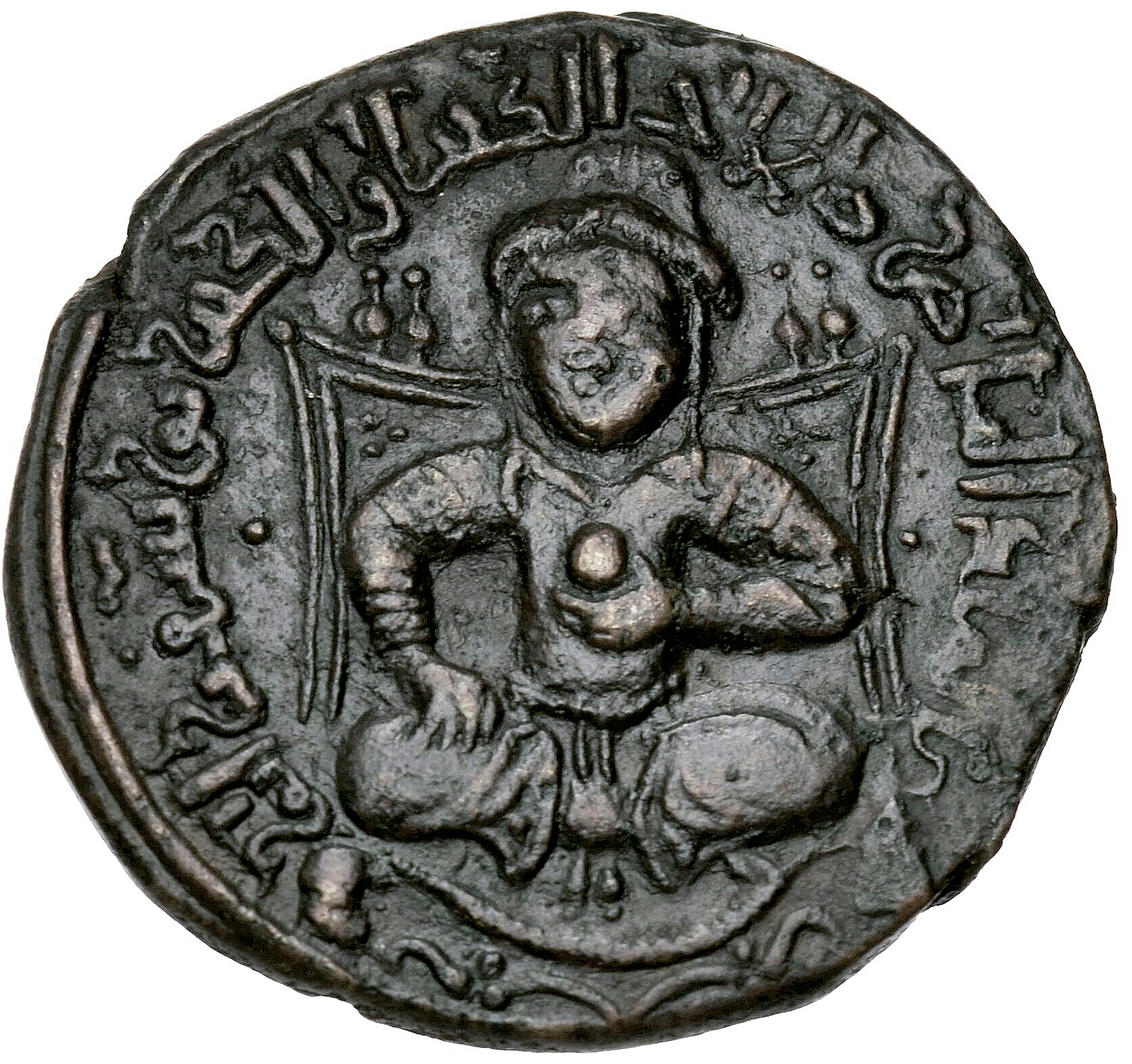
Saladin began his military career in the army of Nur ad-Din, during the Zengid conquest of Egypt in 1163–1169.

In 1167, the Zengids engaged in a new campaign in Egypt. They sacked Bilbais, and the Crusader-Egyptian force and Shirkuh's army were to engage in the Battle of al-Babein on the desert border of the Nile, just west of Giza. The Crusader force enjoyed early success against Shirkuh's troops, but the terrain was too steep and sandy for their horses, and commander Hugh of Caesarea was captured while attacking Saladin's unit. The battle ended in a Zengid victory, one of the "most remarkable victories in recorded history", according to Ibn al-Athir. Saladin and Shirkuh moved towards Alexandria where they were welcomed, given money and arms, and provided a base. Faced by a superior Crusader–Egyptian force attempting to besiege the city, Shirkuh split his army. He and the bulk of his force withdrew from Alexandria, while Saladin was left with the task of guarding the city.

In 1168, the Zengid army was called for a third time in Egypt, as the Crusaders were besieging Cairo. The Crusaders lifted the siege and left. In 1169, Shirkuh lured the vizier into an ambush and killed him after which he seized Egypt in the name of his master Nur ad-Din, becoming the new Fatimid vizier and amir al-juyush with the approval of Caliph al-Adid, and therefore bringing Egypt under formal Zengid dominion. Shirkuh died the same year and was replaced by his nephew Saladin as vizier.

During the reign of Nur al-Din (1146–1174), Tripoli, Yemen and the Hejaz were added to the state of the Zengids. The Artuqids became vassals of the Zengids. Nur ad-Din also took control of Anatolian lands up to Sivas. His state extended from Tripoli to Hamadan and from Yemen to Sivas.

Shirkuh's nephew Saladin was appointed vizier by the last Fatimid caliph al-Adid and Governor of Egypt, in 1169. Al-Adid died in 1171, and Saladin took advantage of this power vacuum, effectively taking control of the country. Upon seizing power, he switched Egypt's allegiance to the Baghdad-based Abbasid Caliphate which adhered to Sunni Islam, rather than traditional Fatimid Shia practice.

=== Loss of Egypt and Syria to Saladin (1175–1176) ===
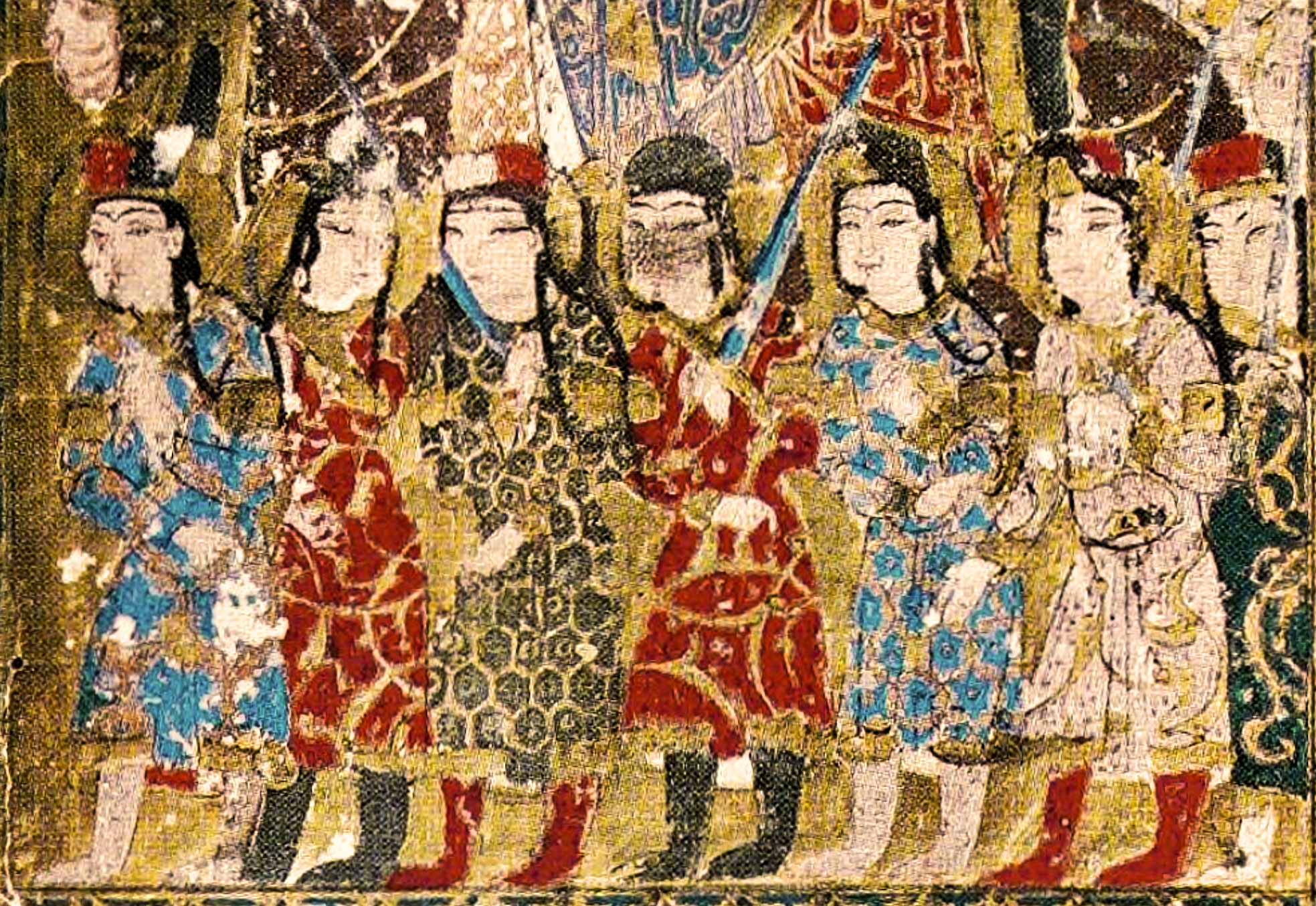
Zengid soldiers armed with long swords and wearing the aqbiya turkiyya coat, tiraz armbands, boots and sharbush hat, at the time of the atabegate of Badr al-Din Lu'lu' in 1218–1219. Kitab al-Aghani, Mosul.

In the early summer of 1174, Nur ad-Din was mustering an army, sending summons to Mosul, Diyar Bakr, and the Jazira in an apparent preparation of an attack against Saladin's Egypt. The Ayyubids held a council upon the revelation of these preparations to discuss the possible threat and Saladin collected his own troops outside Cairo.

On 15 May 1174, Nur ad-Din died after falling ill the previous week and his power was handed to his eleven-year-old son as-Salih Ismail al-Malik. His death left Saladin with political independence and in a letter to as-Salih, he promised to "act as a sword" against his enemies and referred to the death of his father as an "earthquake shock". In the wake of Nur ad-Din's death, Saladin was tempted to annex Syria before it could possibly fall into the hands of a rival, but he feared that attacking a land that formerly belonged to his master —forbidden in the Islamic principles in which he believed— could portray him as hypocritical, thus making him unsuitable for leading the war against the Crusaders.

As-Salih took refuge in Aleppo in August 1174, which he ruled until 1181, when he died of illness and was replaced by his cousin Imad al-Din Zengi II. Gumushtigin, the emir of the city and a captain of Nur ad-Din's veterans assumed guardianship over him. The emir Gumushtigin prepared to unseat all his rivals in Syria and the Jazira, beginning with Damascus. In this emergency, the emir of Damascus appealed to Saif ad-Din of Mosul (a cousin of Gumushtigin) for assistance against Aleppo, but he refused, forcing the Syrians to request the aid of Saladin, who complied. Saladin rode across the desert with 700 picked horsemen, passing through al-Kerak then reaching Bosra. According to his own account, he was joined by "emirs, soldiers, and Bedouins—the emotions of their hearts to be seen on their faces." On 23 November, he arrived in Damascus amid general acclamation and rested at his father's old home there, until the gates of the Citadel of Damascus, whose commander Raihan initially refused to surrender, were opened to Saladin four days later, after a brief siege by his brother Tughtakin ibn Ayyub. He installed himself in the castle and received the homage and salutations of the inhabitants.

Leaving his brother Tughtakin ibn Ayyub as Governor of Damascus, Saladin proceeded to reduce other cities that had belonged to Nur ad-Din, but were now practically independent. His army conquered Hama with relative ease, but avoided attacking Homs because of the strength of its citadel. Saladin moved north towards Aleppo, besieging it on 30 December after Gumushtigin refused to abdicate his throne. As-Salih, fearing capture by Saladin, came out of his palace and appealed to the inhabitants not to surrender him and the city to the invading force. One of Saladin's chroniclers claimed "the people came under his spell".

Meanwhile, Saladin's rivals in Syria and Jazira waged a propaganda war against him, claiming he had "forgotten his own condition [servant of Nur ad-Din]" and showed no gratitude for his old master by besieging his son, rising "in rebellion against his Lord". Soon, Saladin entered Homs and captured its citadel in March 1175, after stubborn resistance from its defenders.

==== Battle of the Horns of Hama (1175) ====
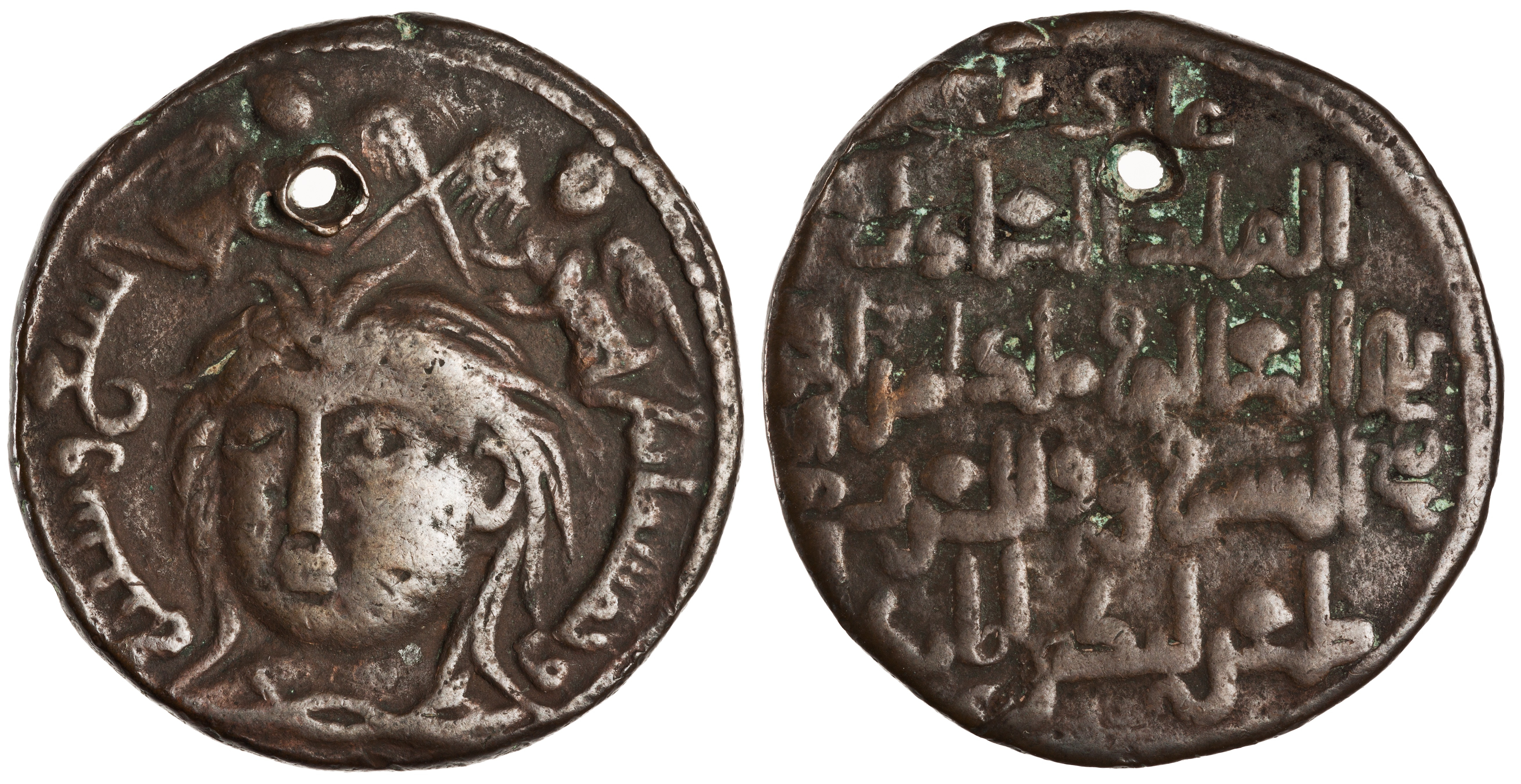
Coinage of Saif ad-Din (r.1170–1180), Zengid ruler of Mosul. Dated 569 H (1173–1174 CE). Legend in Arabic: "The Wise and Just King/ the King of the Amirs/ of East and West/ Tughriltakin Atabeg/ Ghazi b./ Mawdud/ b. Zangi".

Saladin's successes alarmed Saif ad-Din, Zengid ruler of Mosul. As head of the Zengids, he regarded Syria and Mesopotamia as his family estate and was angered when Saladin attempted to usurp his dynasty's holdings. Saif ad-Din mustered a large army and dispatched it to Aleppo, whose defenders anxiously had awaited them. The combined forces of Mosul and Aleppo marched against Saladin in Hama. Heavily outnumbered, Saladin initially attempted to make terms with the Zengids by abandoning all conquests north of the Damascus province, but they refused, insisting he return to Egypt. Seeing that confrontation was unavoidable, Saladin prepared for battle, taking up a superior position at the Horns of Hama, hills by the gorge of the Orontes River. On 13 April 1175, the Zengid troops marched to attack his forces, but soon found themselves surrounded by Saladin's Ayyubid veterans, who crushed them. The battle ended in a decisive victory for Saladin, who pursued the Zengid fugitives to the gates of Aleppo, forcing as-Salih's advisers to recognize Saladin's control of the provinces of Damascus, Homs, and Hama, as well as a number of towns outside Aleppo such as Ma'arat al-Numan.

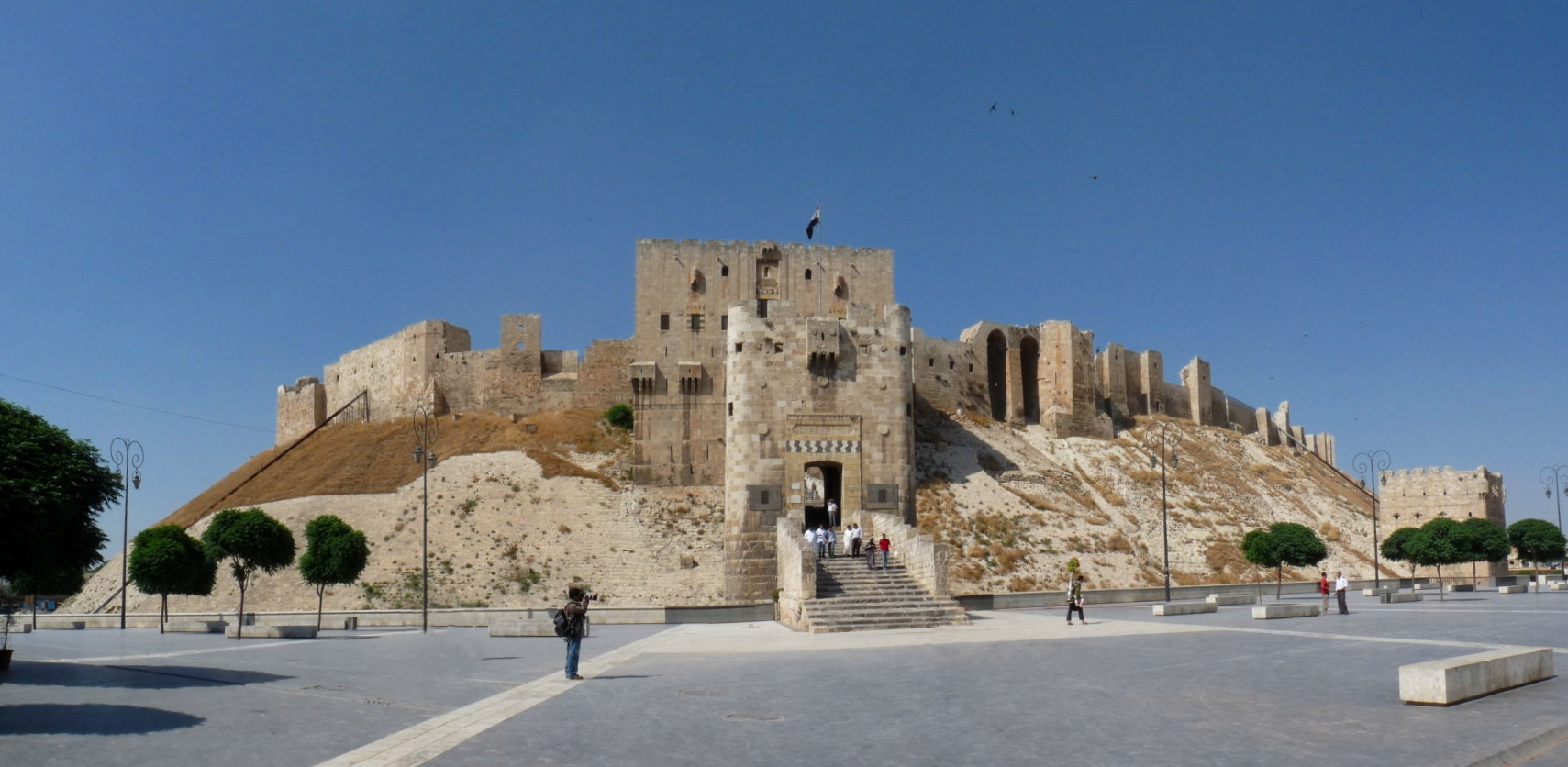
Citadel of Aleppo.

After his victory against the Zengids, Saladin proclaimed himself king and suppressed the name of as-Salih in Friday prayers and Islamic coinage. From then on, he ordered prayers in all the mosques of Syria and Egypt as the sovereign king and he issued at the Cairo mint gold coins bearing his official title —al-Malik an-Nasir Yusuf Ayyub, ala ghaya "the King Strong to Aid, Joseph son of Job; exalted be the standard." The Abbasid caliph in Baghdad graciously welcomed Saladin's assumption of power and declared him "Sultan of Egypt and Syria". The Battle of Hama did not end the contest for power between the Ayyubids and the Zengids, with the final confrontation occurring in the spring of 1176. Saladin had gathered massive reinforcements from Egypt while Saif ad-Din was levying troops among the minor states of Diyarbakir and al-Jazira. When Saladin crossed the Orontes, leaving Hama, the sun was eclipsed. He viewed this as an omen, but he continued his march north. He reached the Sultan's Mound, roughly 25 km (16 mi) from Aleppo, where his forces encountered Saif ad-Din's army. A hand-to-hand fight ensued and the Zengids managed to plough Saladin's left-wing, driving it before him when Saladin himself charged at the head of the Zengid guard. The Zengid forces panicked and most of Saif ad-Din's officers ended up being killed or captured—Saif ad-Din narrowly escaped. The Zengid army's camp, horses, baggage, tents, and stores were seized by the Ayyubids. The Zengid prisoners of war, however, were given gifts and freed. All of the booty from the Ayyubid victory was accorded to the army, Saladin not keeping anything himself.

Saladin continued towards Aleppo, which still closed its gates to him, halting before the city. On the way, his army took Buza'a and then captured Manbij. From there, they headed west to besiege the fortress of A'zaz on 15 May. A'zaz capitulated on 21 June 1176, and Saladin then hurried his forces to Aleppo to punish Gumushtigin. His assaults were again resisted, but he managed to secure not only a truce, but a mutual alliance with Aleppo, in which Gumushtigin and as-Salih were allowed to continue their hold on the city, and in return, they recognized Saladin as the sovereign over all of the dominions he conquered. The Artuqid emirs of Mardin and Keyfa, the Muslim allies of Aleppo, also recognised Saladin as the King of Syria. When the treaty was concluded, the younger sister of as-Salih came to Saladin and requested the return of the Fortress of A'zaz; he complied and escorted her back to the gates of Aleppo with numerous presents.

The Zengis ruler As-Salih Ismail al-Malik continued to rule Aleppo as a vassal of Saladin until 1181, when he died of illness and was replaced by his cousin Imad al-Din Zengi II.

=== Loss of Jazira to Saladin (1182) ===
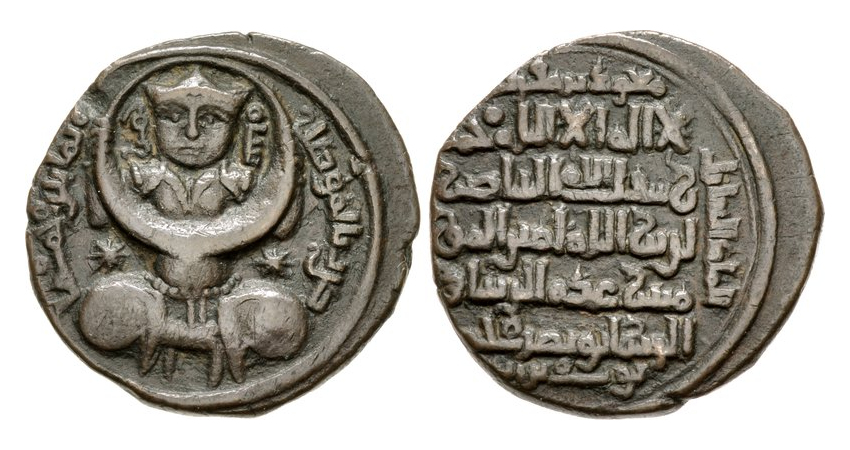
Coinage of Izz ad-Din Mas'ud, Zengid ruler of Mosul, with crowned Turkic figure holding a moon symbol. Mosul mint, dated 1189–90. The reverse mentions in Arabic the name and titles of the Abbasid caliph and Abbasid heir presumptive in five lines, and the name and titles of the Ayyubid overlord Saladin, and 'Izz al-Din Mas'ud.

The Zengid ruler Sayf al-Din Ghazi II died in June 1181 and his brother Izz ad-Din inherited the leadership of Mosul. On 4 December, the crown prince of the Zengids, as-Salih, died in Aleppo. Prior to his death, he had his chief officers swear an oath of loyalty to Izz ad-Din, as he was the only Zengid ruler strong enough to oppose Saladin. Izz ad-Din was welcomed in Aleppo, but possessing it and Mosul put too great of a strain on his abilities. He thus, handed Aleppo to his brother Imad ad-Din Zangi, in exchange for Sinjar. Saladin offered no opposition to these transactions in order to respect the treaty he previously made with the Zengids.

Following the Zengid defeat at Hama, and the continuing lack any unifying figure in the mould of Nur ad-Din, Kukbary (Muzaffar ad-Din Gökböri), the Zengid ruler of Harran, realised that Zengid power was on the wane in Syria and the Jazira and he made the momentous decision to defect to Saladin in 1182. He invited Saladin to occupy the Jazira region, making up northern Mesopotamia. Saladin complied and the truce between him and the Zengids officially ended in September 1182. Prior to his march to Jazira, tensions had grown between the Zengid rulers of the region, primarily concerning their unwillingness to pay deference to Mosul. Before he crossed the Euphrates, Saladin besieged Aleppo for three days, signaling that the truce was over.

Once Saladin reached Bira, near the river, he was joined by Kukbary and Nur ad-Din of Hisn Kayfa and the combined forces captured the cities of Jazira, one after the other. First, Edessa fell, followed by Saruj, then Raqqa, Qirqesiya and Nusaybin. Raqqa was an important crossing point and held by Qutb ad-Din Inal, who had lost Manbij to Saladin in 1176. Upon seeing the large size of Saladin's army, he made little effort to resist and surrendered on the condition that he would retain his property. From Raqqa, Saladin moved to conquer al-Fudain, al-Husain, Maksim, Durain, 'Araban, and Khabur—all of which swore allegiance to him.

Saladin proceeded to take Nusaybin which offered no resistance. A medium-sized town, Nusaybin was not of great importance, but it was located in a strategic position between Mardin and Mosul and within easy reach of Diyarbakir. Meanwhile, in Aleppo, the emir of the city Zangi raided Saladin's cities to the north and east, such as Balis, Manbij, Saruj, Buza'a, al-Karzain. He also destroyed his own citadel at A'zaz to prevent it from being used by the Ayyubids if they were to conquer it.

=== Battle for Mosul (1182–1183) ===
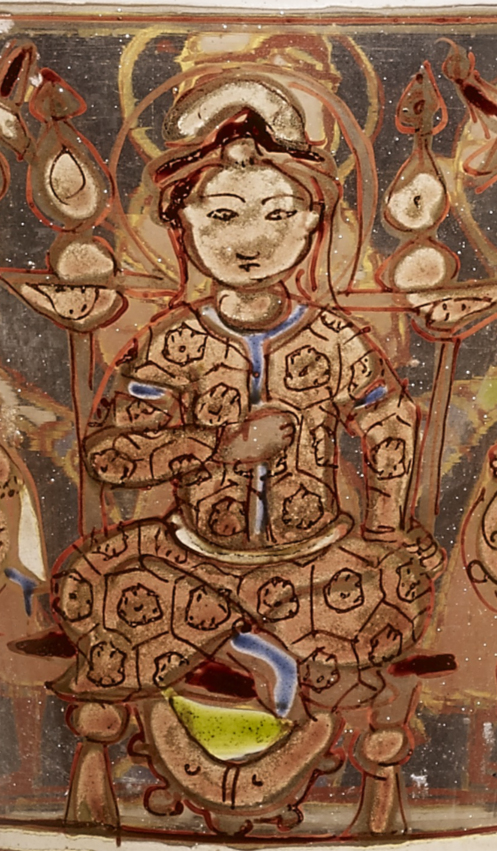
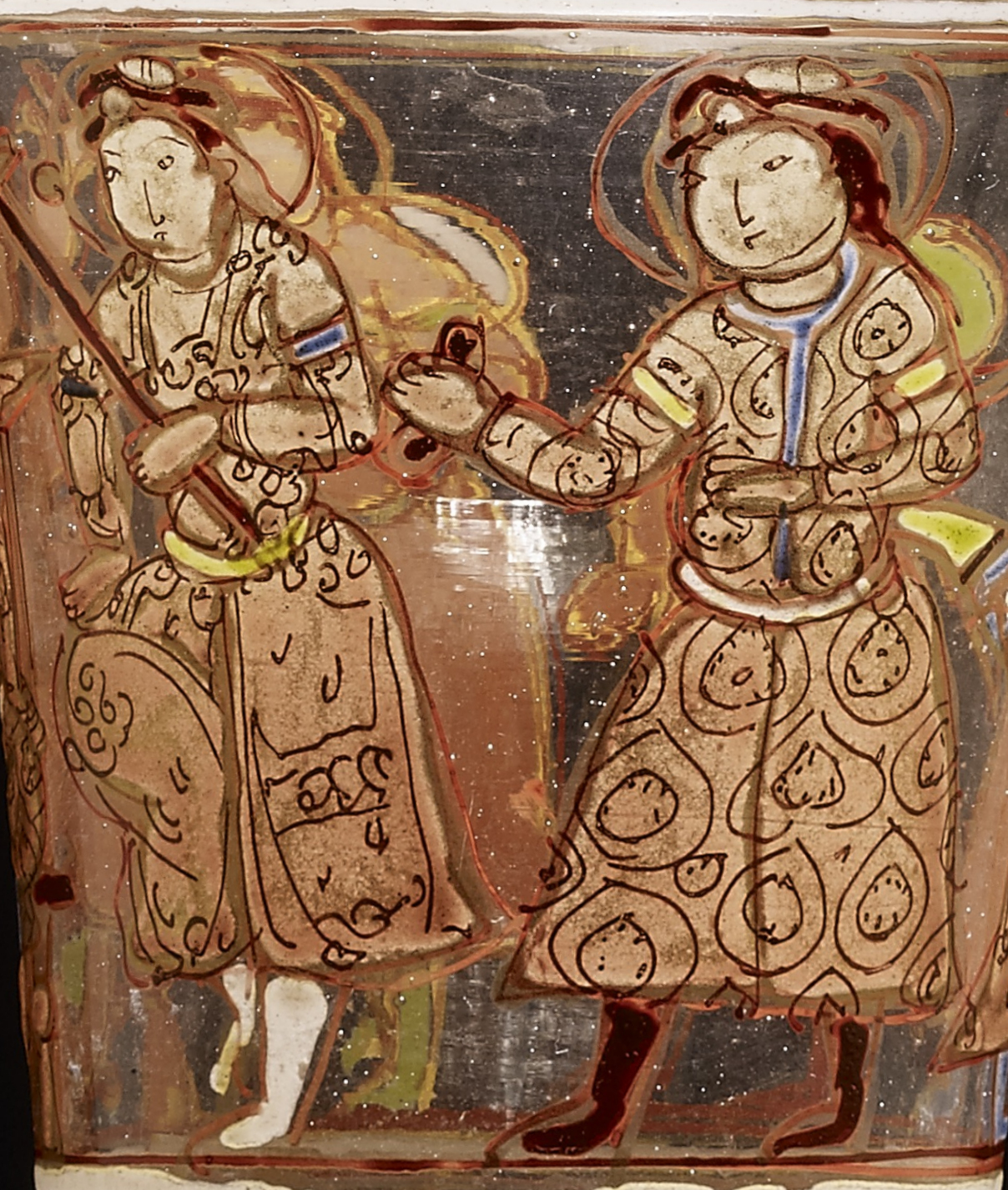
Northern Mesopotamian illustrative art at the time of the rivalry between Ayyubids and Zengids: the Palmer Cup (1200-1215). The ruler and attendants are similar to those found in the manuscript Kitab al-Dariyaq or metalworks from the Mosul or North Jazira area. They wear Seljuk-type clothes, together with the typical sharbush headgear.

As Saladin approached Mosul, he faced the issue of taking over a large city and justifying the action. The Zengids of Mosul appealed to an-Nasir, the Abbasid caliph at Baghdad whose vizier favored them. An-Nasir sent Badr al-Badr (a high-ranking religious figure) to mediate between the two sides. Saladin arrived at the city on 10 November 1182. Izz ad-Din would not accept his terms because he considered them disingenuous and extensive, and Saladin immediately laid siege to the heavily fortified city.

After several minor skirmishes and a stalemate in the siege that was initiated by the caliph, Saladin intended to find a way to withdraw without damage to his reputation while still keeping up some military pressure. He decided to attack Sinjar, which was held by Izz ad-Din's brother Sharaf ad-Din. It fell after a 15-day siege on 30 December. Saladin's soldiers broke their discipline, plundering the city; Saladin managed to protect the governor and his officers only by sending them to Mosul. After establishing a garrison at Sinjar, he awaited a coalition assembled by Izz ad-Din consisting of his forces, those from Aleppo, Mardin, and Armenia. Saladin and his army met the coalition at Harran in February 1183, but on hearing of his approach, the latter sent messengers to Saladin asking for peace. Each force returned to their cities and al-Fadil wrote: "They [Izz ad-Din's coalition] advanced like men, like women they vanished."

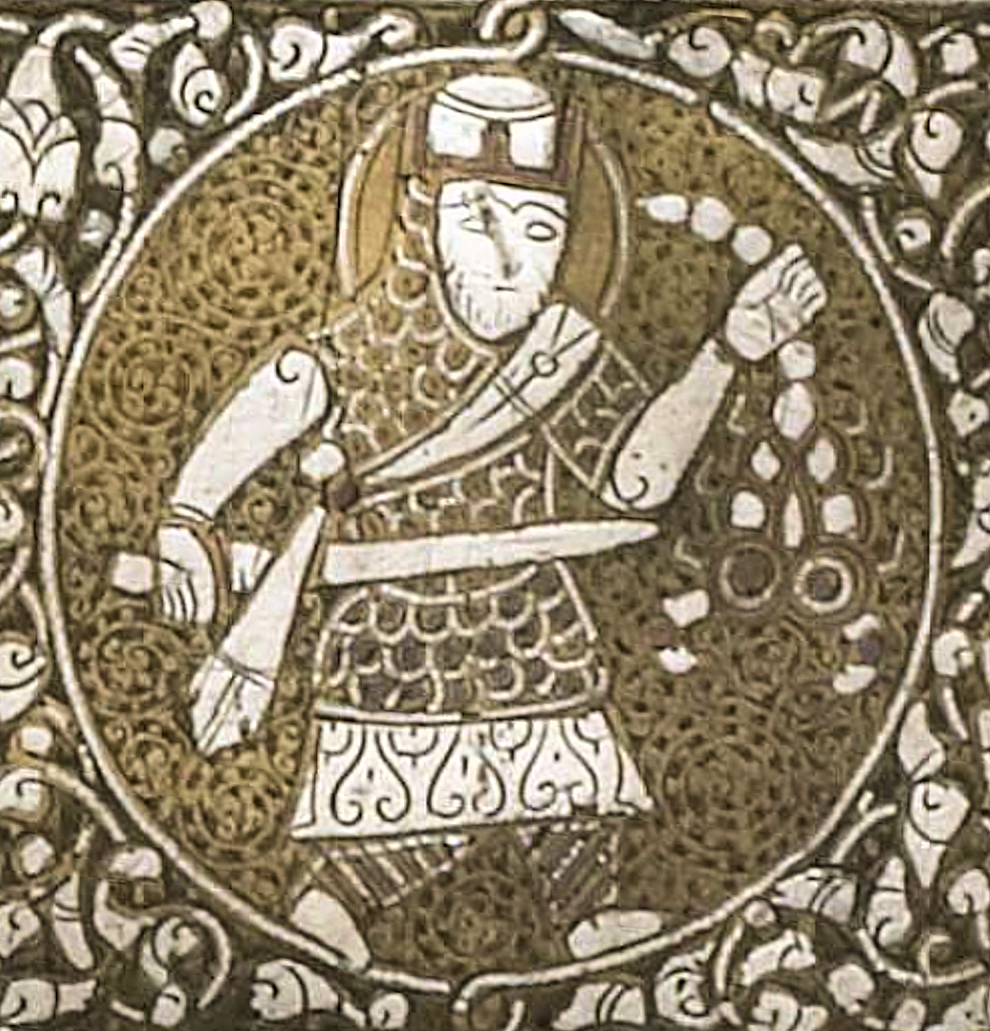
Detail of inlaid brass writing box, showing soldier wearing a mail hauberk. Mosul, 1230–1250 CE, British Museum.

From the point of view of Saladin, in terms of territory, the war against Mosul was going well, but he still failed to achieve his objectives and his army was shrinking; Taqi ad-Din took his men back to Hama, while Nasir ad-Din Muhammad and his forces had left. This encouraged Izz ad-Din and his allies to take the offensive. The previous coalition regrouped at Harzam some 140 km from Harran. In early April, without waiting for Nasir ad-Din, Saladin and Taqi ad-Din commenced their advance against the coalition, marching eastward to Ras al-Ein unhindered. By late April, after three days of "actual fighting", according to Saladin, the Ayyubids had captured Amid. He handed the city to Nur ad-Din Muhammad together with its stores, which consisted of 80,000 candles, a tower full of arrowheads, and 1,040,000 books. In return for a diploma—granting him the city, Nur ad-Din swore allegiance to Saladin, promising to follow him in every expedition in the war against the Crusaders, and repairing the damage done to the city. The fall of Amid, in addition to territory, convinced Il-Ghazi of Mardin to enter the service of Saladin, weakening Izz ad-Din's coalition.

Saladin attempted to gain the Caliph an-Nasir's support against Izz ad-Din by sending him a letter requesting a document that would give him legal justification for taking over Mosul and its territories. Saladin aimed to persuade the caliph claiming that while he conquered Egypt and Yemen under the flag of the Abbasids, the Zengids of Mosul openly supported the Seljuks (rivals of the caliphate) and only came to the Caliph when in need. He also accused Izz ad-Din's forces of disrupting the Muslim "Holy War" against the Crusaders, stating "they are not content not to fight, but they prevent those who can". Saladin defended his own conduct claiming that he had come to Syria to fight the Crusaders, end the heresy of the Assassins, and stop the wrong-doing of the Muslims. He also promised that if Mosul was given to him, it would lead to the capture of Jerusalem, Constantinople, Georgia, and the lands of the Almohads in the Maghreb, "until the word of God is supreme and the Abbasid caliphate has wiped the world clean, turning the churches into mosques". Saladin stressed that all this would happen by the will of God, and instead of asking for financial or military support from the Caliph, he would capture and give the Caliph the territories of Tikrit, Daquq, Khuzestan, Kish Island, and Oman.

=== Fall of Zengid Aleppo (1183) ===
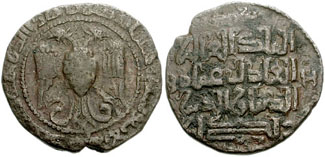
Coinage of "Zangi", emir of Aleppo (Imad ad-Din Zengi II). Dated AH 583 (1187-88 CE). Double headed eagle with the name and titles of the Abbasid caliph al Nasir on breast; mint and date around / Four line legend citing Zengi; tamghas at sides.

Saladin turned his attention from Mosul to Aleppo, sending his brother Taj al-Muluk Buri to capture Tell Khalid, 130 km northeast of Aleppo. A siege was set, but the governor of Tell Khalid surrendered upon the arrival of Saladin himself on 17 May before a siege could take place. According to Imad ad-Din, after Tell Khalid, Saladin took a detour northwards to Aintab, but he gained possession of it when his army turned towards it, allowing him to quickly move backward another c. 100 km towards Aleppo. On 21 May, he camped outside the city, positioning himself east of the Citadel of Aleppo, while his forces encircled the suburb of Banaqusa to the northeast and Bab Janan to the west. He stationed his men dangerously close to the city, hoping for an early success.

Zangi did not offer long resistance. He was unpopular with his subjects and wished to return to his Sinjar, the city he governed previously. An exchange was negotiated where Zangi would hand over Aleppo to Saladin in return for the restoration of his control of Sinjar, Nusaybin, and Raqqa. Zangi would hold these territories as Saladin's vassals in terms of military service. On 12 June, Aleppo was formally placed in Ayyubid hands. The people of Aleppo had not known about these negotiations and were taken by surprise when Saladin's standard was hoisted over the citadel. Two emirs, including an old friend of Saladin, Izz ad-Din Jurduk, welcomed and pledged their service to him. Saladin replaced the Hanafi courts with Shafi'i administration, despite a promise that he would not interfere in the religious leadership of the city. Although he was short of money, Saladin also allowed the departing Zangi to take all the stores of the citadel that he could travel with and to sell the remainder—which Saladin purchased himself. In spite of his earlier hesitation to go through with the exchange, he had no doubts about his success, stating that Aleppo was "the key to the lands" and "this city is the eye of Syria and the citadel is its pupil". For Saladin, the capture of the city marked the end of over eight years of waiting since he told Farrukh-Shah that "we have only to do the milking and Aleppo will be ours".

=== Final decline (1183–1250) ===
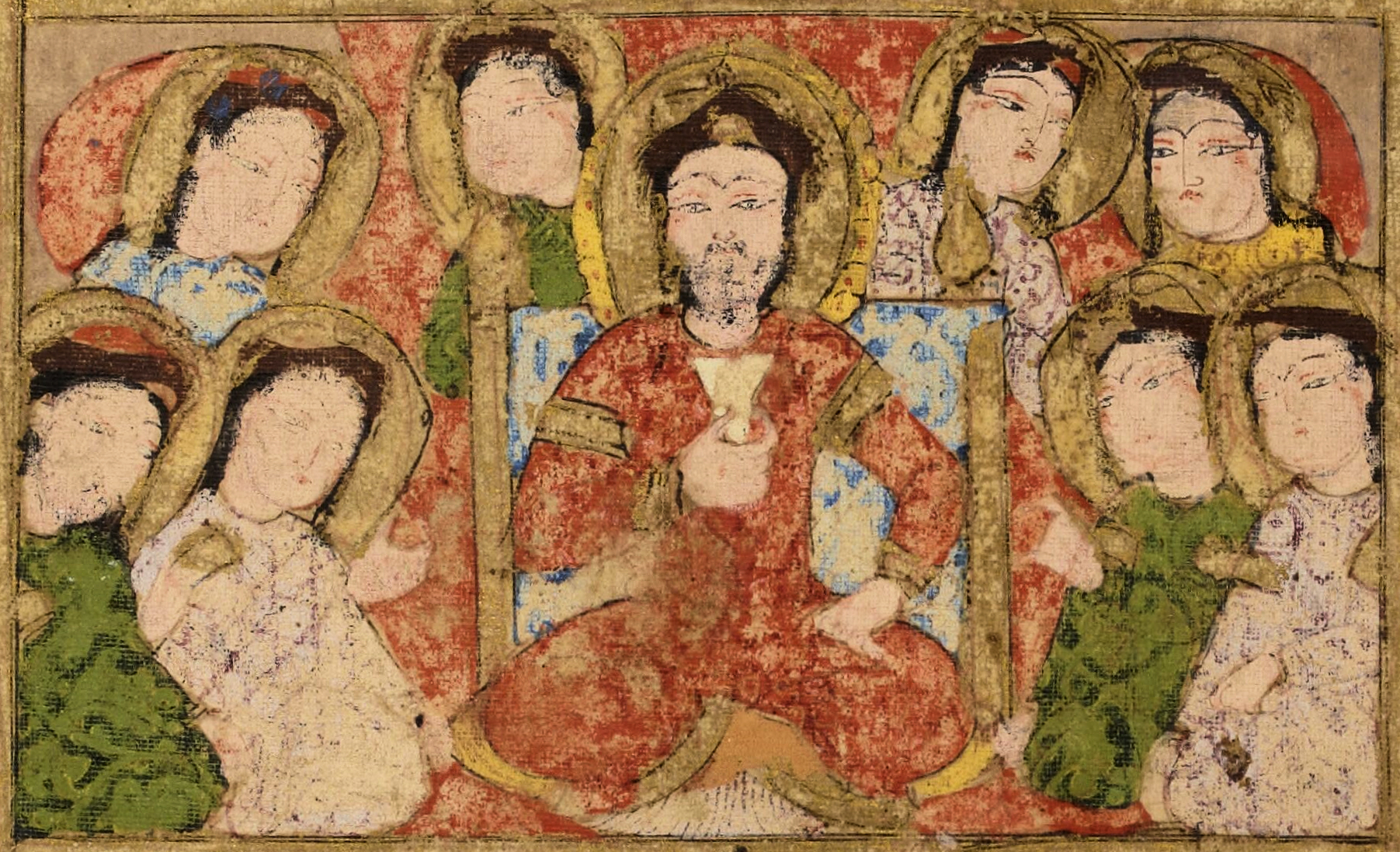
Royal court detail, ruler in Turkic dress, wearing the sharbush hat. 1198–1199, probably Mosul. Kitâb al-Diryâq.

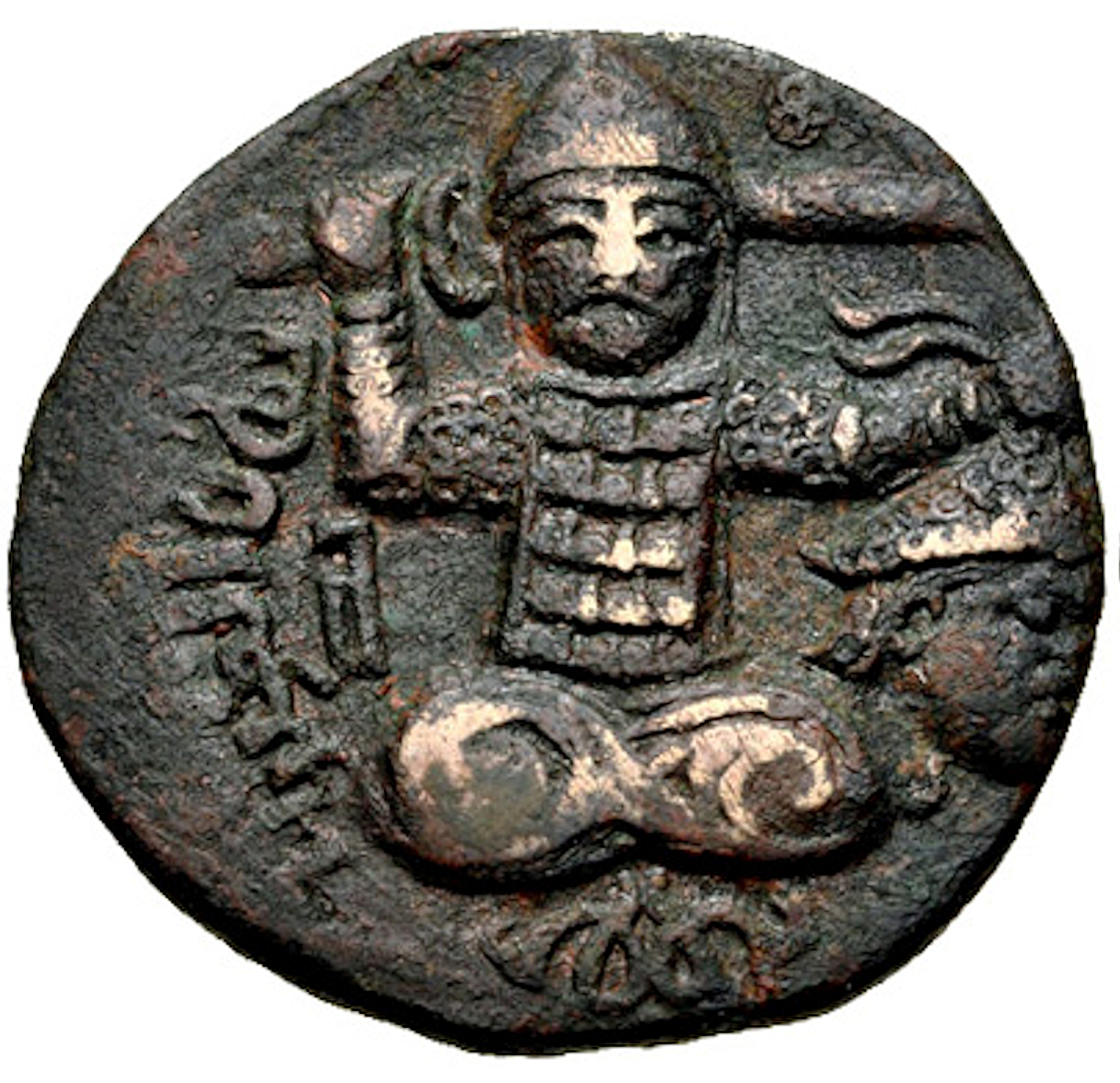
Turk seated facing with legs crossed, holding sword and crowned severed head, with legend to left "Nur al-Din Atabeg" (نور الدين اتا / بك), probably Nur al-Din Arslan Shah I. Coinage of Husam al-Din Yuluq Arslan, dated AH 596 (1199–1200 CE).

Saladin conquered Aleppo in 1183, ending Zengid rule in Syria. Saladin launched his last offensive against Mosul in late 1185, hoping for an easy victory over the presumably demoralized Zengid Emir of Mosul Mas'ud, but failed due to the city's unexpectedly stiff resistance and a serious illness which caused Saladin to withdraw to Harran. Upon Abbasid encouragement, Saladin and Mas'ud negotiated a treaty in March 1186 that left the Zengids in control of Mosul, but under the obligation to supply the Ayyubids with military support when requested.

In 1204, Saladin's brother and successor, the Ayyubid ruler Al-Adil I, dispatched an army under the leadership of his own son al-Ashraf of Harran, accompanied by his brother Al-Awhad Ayyub, to relieve the Zengid emir of Sinjar, Qutb al-Din, from an assault by his cousin Nur ad-Din Arslan Shah I of Mosul, the chief Zengid emir. In April 1204 the Ayyubid coalition swiftly defeated Nur ad-Din's forces at Nusaybin, chasing them back to Mosul where they attacked several of the surrounding villages. By September the Ayyubids had established a peace with Nur ad-Din.

In 1207, the Ayyubids under Al-Awhad Ayyub, starting from their base in Mayyafariqin, captured Akhlat in Anatolia, putting an end to the Ahlatshahs.

The Zengids and main contemporary polities in continental Asia c. 1205

Al-Adil I again attempted to annex the Zengid states in 1209, and besieged Sinjar. The Zengid ruler of Mosul Nur al-Din Arslan Shah I allied with Muzzafar al-Din Kukburi, ruler of Erbil, and resisted the Ayyubid offensive. They reached a truce, according to which al-Adid could retain the lands he conquered in Sinjar (thereafter ruled by the "Ayyubids of Mayyafariqin & Jabal Sinjar", the sons of al-Adid al-Ashraf and Al-Awhad Ayyub), and Arslan Shah would recognize Ayyubid suzerainty on his coinage. As Arslan Shah's health was declining, and his sons were still young, he chose his Commander of the Army Badr al-Din Lu'lu' as protector of his sons and promoted him to atabeg upon his death in 1211. The son and two grandsons of Arslan Shah continued to rule as children in Northern Iraq as Emirs of Mosul and Sinjar until 1234, when Badr al-Din Lu'lu' formally took over, possibly after assassinating the last Zengid Emir of Mosul Nasir ad-Din Mahmud. He ruled in his own name from 1234 until his death in 1259, accepting Mongol suzerainty after 1243.

Northern Iraq (al-Jazira region), continued to be under Zengid rule until 1250, with its last Emir Mahmud al-Malik al-Zahir (1241–1250, son of Mu'izz al-Din Mahmud). In 1250, al-Jazira fell under the domination of An-Nasir Yusuf, the Ayyubid emir of Aleppo, marking the end of Zengid rule.

The next period would be marked by the arrival of the Mongols: in 1262 Mosul was sacked by the Mongols of Hulagu, following a siege of almost a year, which put an end to the short rule of the sons of Badr al-Din Lu'lu'.

== Military ==
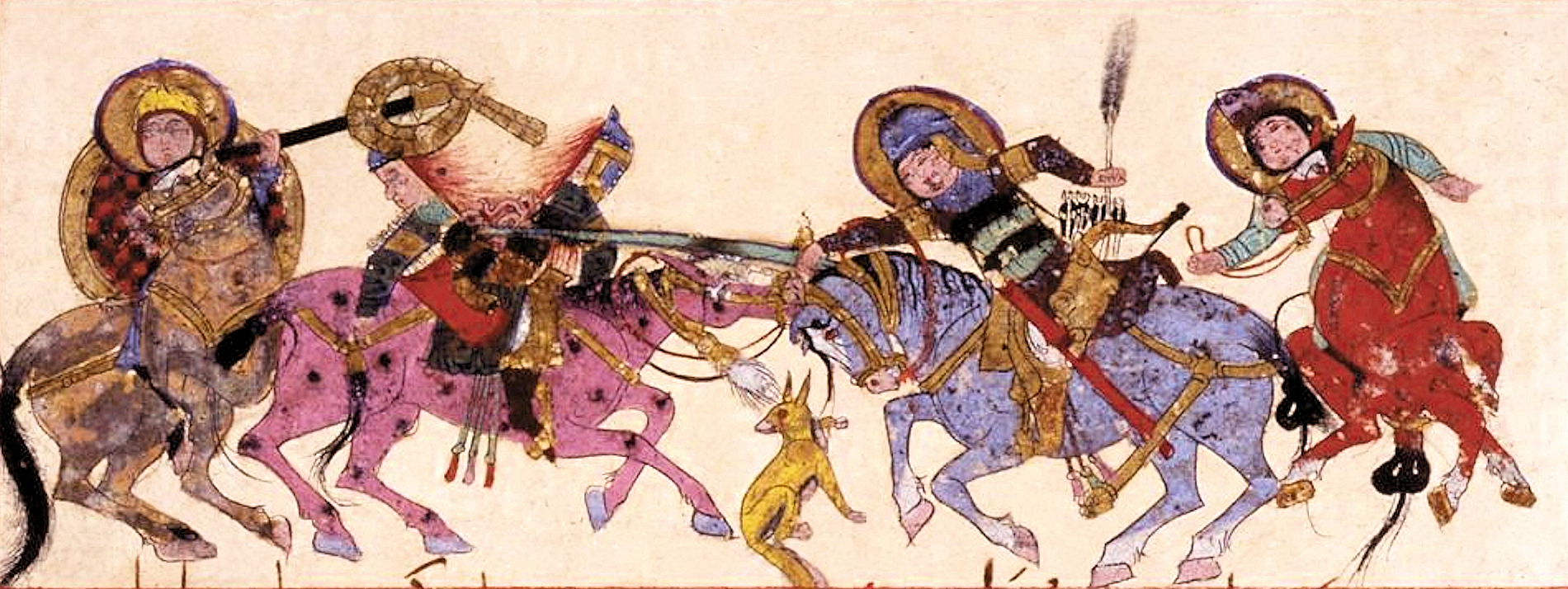
Battle scene, in Varka and Golshah, mid-13th century Seljuk Anatolia.

The military of the Zengids, like that of the other Atabegates, continued the traditions of the Seljuk Empire. Professional Askar and Ghulam troops were combined with mercenaries and auxiliary Turcoman & Kurdish tribal elements. The best description of these troops appears in the mid-13th century Warqa wa Gulshah, where numerous weapons are depicted, such as javelins, spears, swords, bows, maces and lassos. The protective equipment can be quite heavy, including helmets and hauberk. Bows and arrows were used extensively, and dense volleys could pierce armour or even stop a Crusader charge on occasion. Against regular armies, Turcoman harassment techniques were extensively used.

The Zengids in particular played a major military role against Crusaders, led by such major military figures as Imad al-Din Zengi or Nur al-Din Zengi. Nur al-Din's army mainly consisted in Turcoman horse archers and Kurd spear-armed horsemen, in addition to professional ghulams, and Bedouin auxiliary cavalry, as well as large infantry elements. They were also skilled in siege warfare. Numbers were not very large, the ruler's askar troops numbering from 1,000 to 3,000, to which were added auxiliary troops numbering from 10,000 to 15,000. The Zengid model was also used by Saladin and his successors.

== Metalwork ==
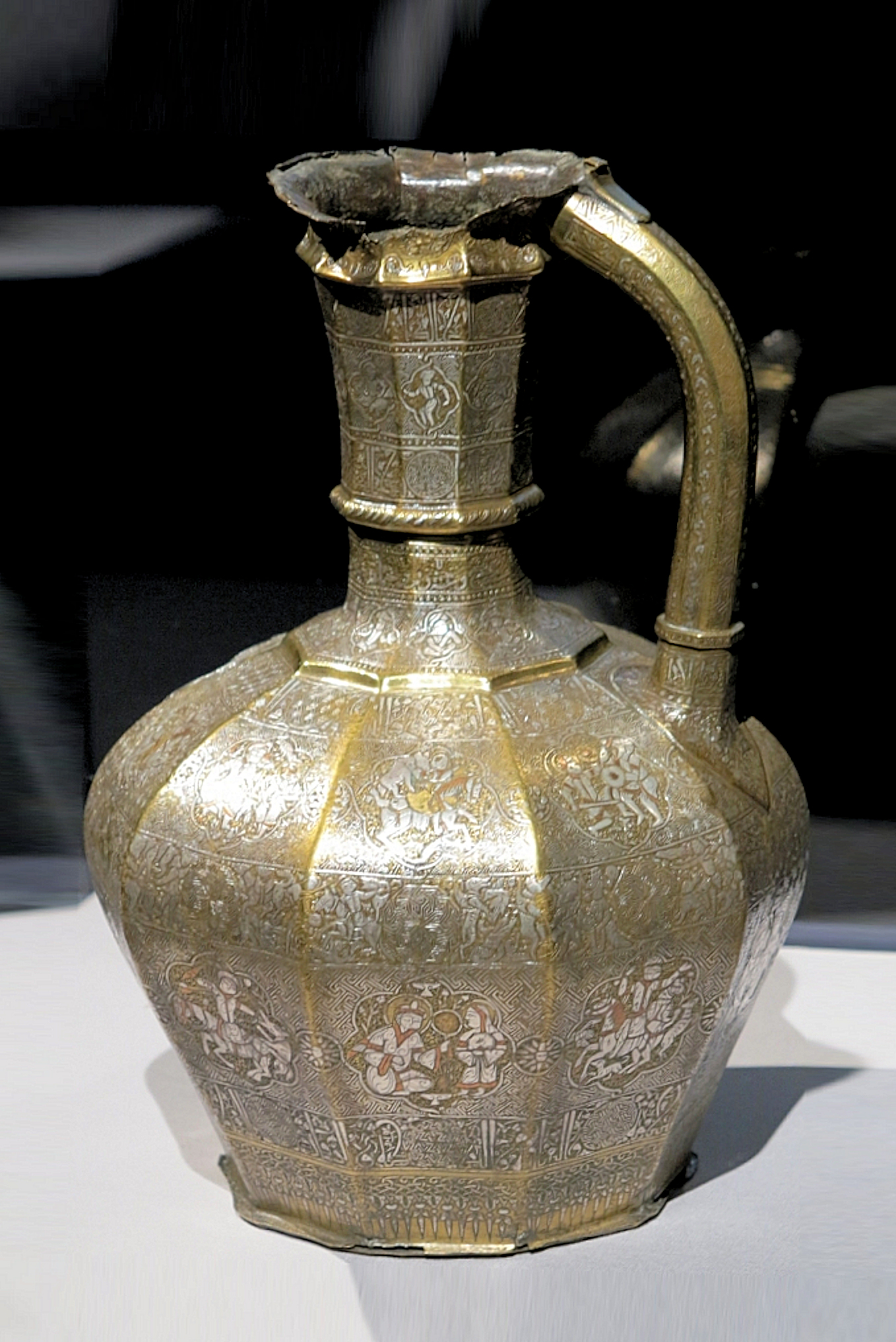
The Blacas ewer, made by Shuja' ibn Man'a in Mosul in 1232, is one of the most famous brass pieces from Mosul.

In the 13th century, Mosul had a flourishing industry making luxury brass items that were ornately inlaid with silver. Many of these items survive today; in fact, of all medieval Islamic artifacts, Mosul brasswork has the most epigraphic inscriptions. However, the only reference to this industry in contemporary sources is the account of Ibn Sa'id, an Andalusian geographer who traveled through the region around 1250. He wrote that "there are many crafts in the city, especially inlaid brass vessels which are exported (and presented) to rulers". These were expensive items that only the wealthiest could afford, and it wasn't until the early 1200s that Mosul had the demand for large-scale production of them. Mosul was then a wealthy, prosperous capital city, first for the Zengids and then for Badr al-Din Lu'lu'.

The origins of Mosul's inlaid brasswork industry are uncertain. The city had an iron industry in the late 10th century, when al-Muqaddasi recorded that it exported iron and iron goods like buckets, knives and chains. However, no surviving metal objects from Mosul are known before the early 13th century. Inlaid metalworking in the Islamic world was first developed in Khurasan in the 12th century by silversmiths facing a shortage of silver. By the mid-12th century, Herat in particular had gained a reputation for its high-quality inlaid metalwork. The practice of inlaying "required relatively few tools" and the technique spread westward, perhaps by Khurasani artisans moving to other cities.

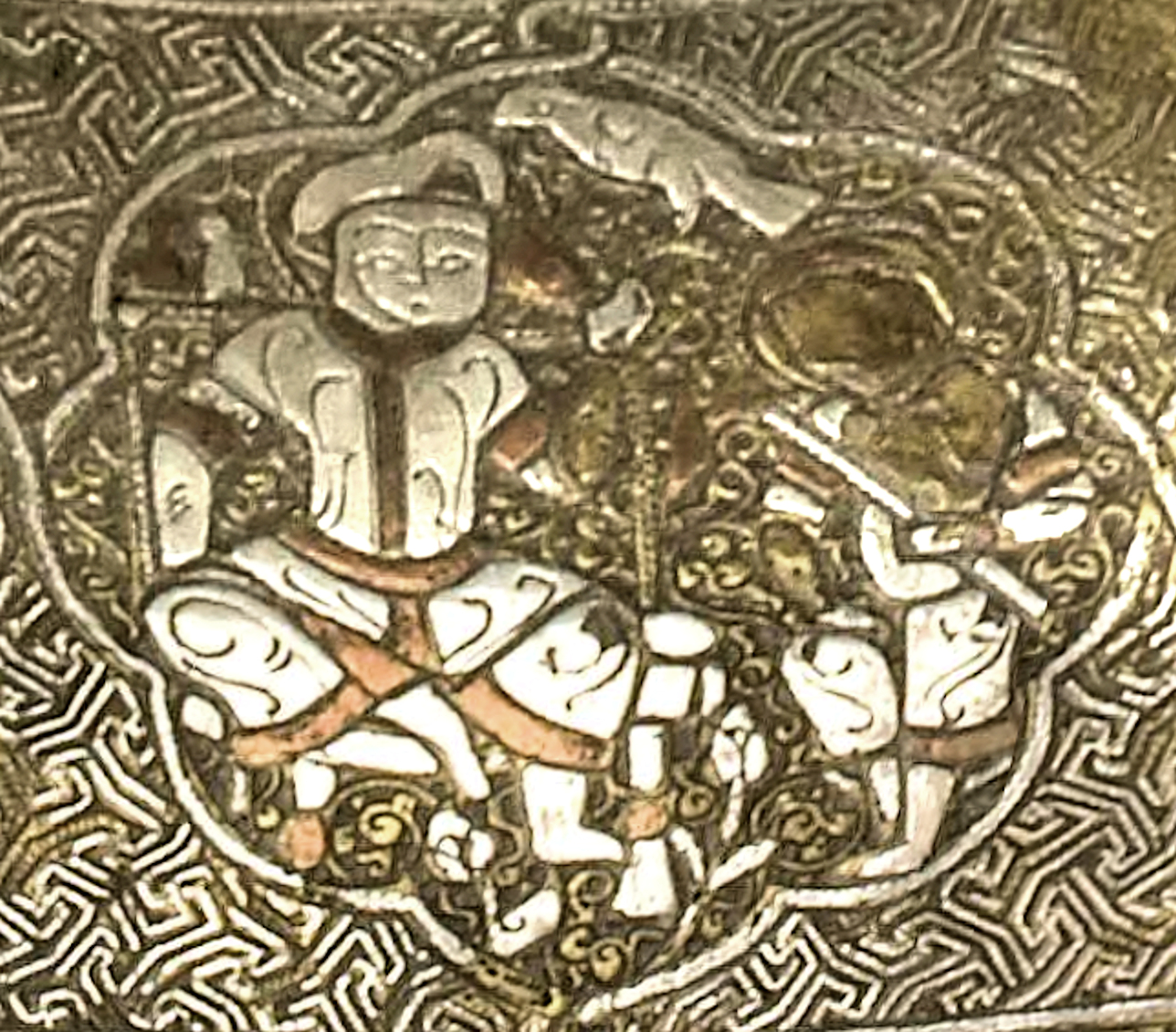
Regnal scene on the Blacas ewer, 1232, Mosul, Zengid dynasty.

By the turn of the 13th century, the silver-inlaid-brass technique had reached Mosul. A pair of engraved brass flabella found in Egypt and possibly made in Mosul are dated by a Syriac inscription to the year 1202, which would make them the earliest known Mosul brasses with a definite date (although they are not inlaid with anything). One extant item may be even older: an inlaid ewer by the master craftsman Ibrahim ibn Mawaliya is of an unknown date, but D.S. Rice estimated that it was made around 1200. Production of inlaid brasswork in Mosul may have already begun before the turn of the century.

The body of Mosul metalwork significantly expands in the 1220s - several signed and dated items are known from this decade, which according to Julian Raby "probably reflects the craft's growing status and production." In the two decades from roughly 1220 to 1240, the Mosul brass industry saw "rapid innovations in technique, decoration, and composition". Artisans were inspired by miniature paintings produced in the Mosul area.

Mosul seems to have become predominant among Muslim centers of metalwork in the early 13th century. Evidence is partial and indirect - relatively few objects which directly state where they were made exist, and in the rest of cases it depends on nisbahs. However, al-Mawsili is by far the most common nisbah; only two others are attested: al-Is'irdi (referring to someone from Siirt) and al-Baghdadi. There are, however, some scientific instruments inlaid with silver that were made in Syria during this period, with the earliest being 1222/3 (619 AH).

Instability after the death of Badr al-Din Lu'lu' in 1259, and especially the Mongol siege and capture of Mosul in July 1262, probably caused a decline in Mosul's metalworking industry. There is a relative lack of known metalwork from the Jazira in the late 1200s; meanwhile, an abundance of metalwork from Mamluk Syria and Egypt is attested from this same period. This doesn't necessarily mean that production in Mosul ended, though, and some extant objects from this period may have been made in Mosul.

== Literature ==
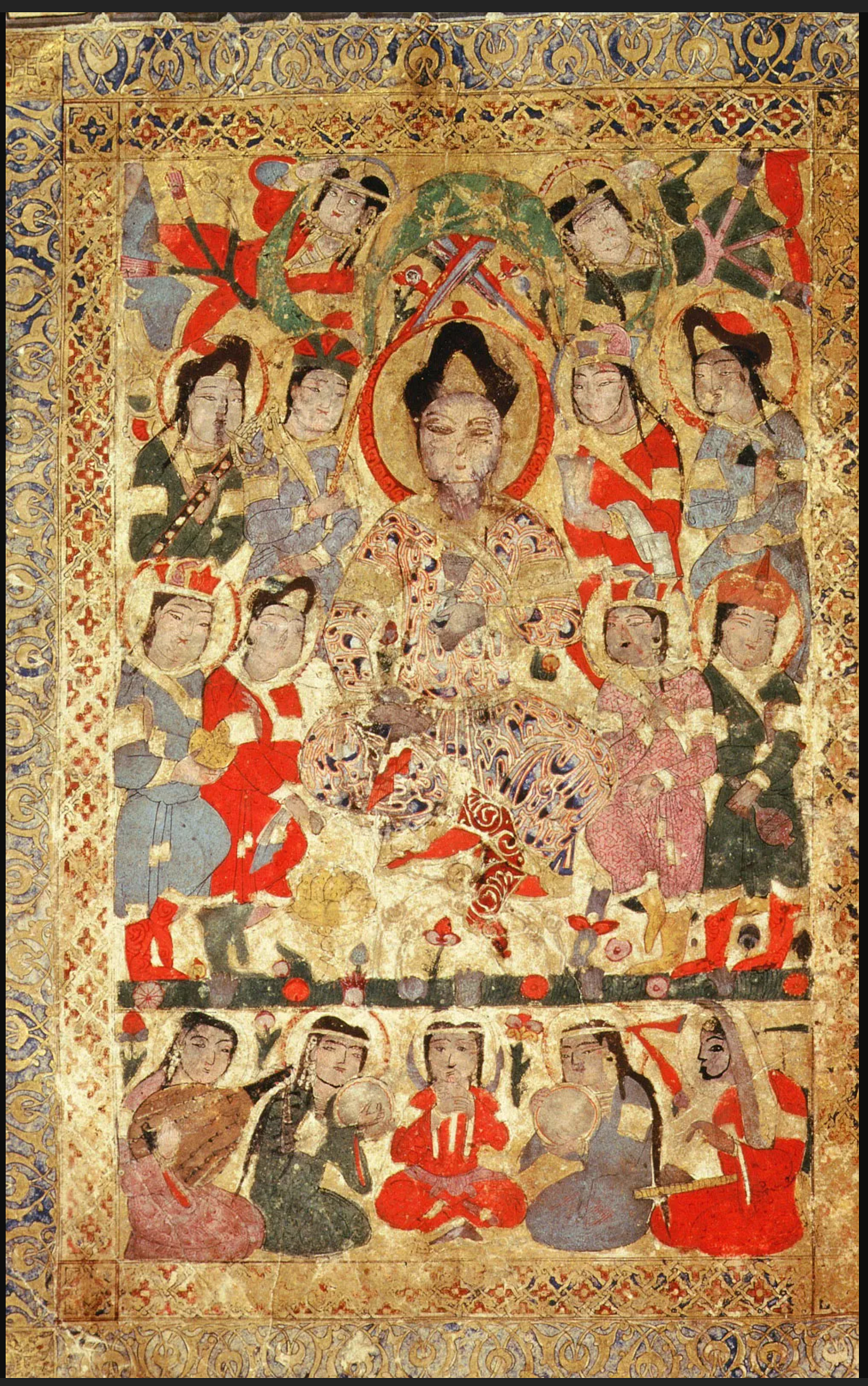
Portrait of Badr al-Din Lu'lu' in 1218–1219, as Zengid Governor of Mosul, under Emir Nasir ad-Din Mahmud. Kitāb al-aghānī.

The area including Syria, Jazira and Iraq saw an "explosion of figural art" from the 12th to 13th centuries, particularly in the areas of decorative art and illustrated manuscripts. This occurred despite religious condemnations against the depiction of living creatures, on the grounds that "it implies a likeness to the creative activity of God".

The origins of this new pictorial tradition are uncertain, but Arabic illustrated manuscripts such as the Maqamat al-Hariri shared many characteristics with Christian Syriac illustrated manuscripts, such as Syriac Gospels (British Library, Add. 7170). This synthesis seems to point to a common pictorial tradition that existed since circa 1180 CE in the region, which was highly influenced by Byzantine art.

The manuscript Kitâb al-Diryâq (Arabic: كتاب الدرياق, romanized: Kitāb al-diryāq, "The Book of Theriac"), or Book of anditodes of pseudo-Galen, is a medieval manuscript allegedly based on the writings of Galen ("pseudo-Galen"). It describes the use of Theriac, an ancient medicinal compound initially used as a cure for the bites of poisonous snakes. Two editions are extant, adorned with beautiful miniatures revealing of the social context at the time of their publication. The earliest manuscript was published in 1198–1199 CE in Mosul or the Jazira region, and is now in the Bibliothèque Nationale de France (MS. Arabe 2964).

The Kitab al-Aghani was created in 1218–1219 in Mosul at the time of the Zengid atabegate of Badr al-Din Lu'lu' (40 years old at the time), and has several frontispieces richly illustrated with court scenes.

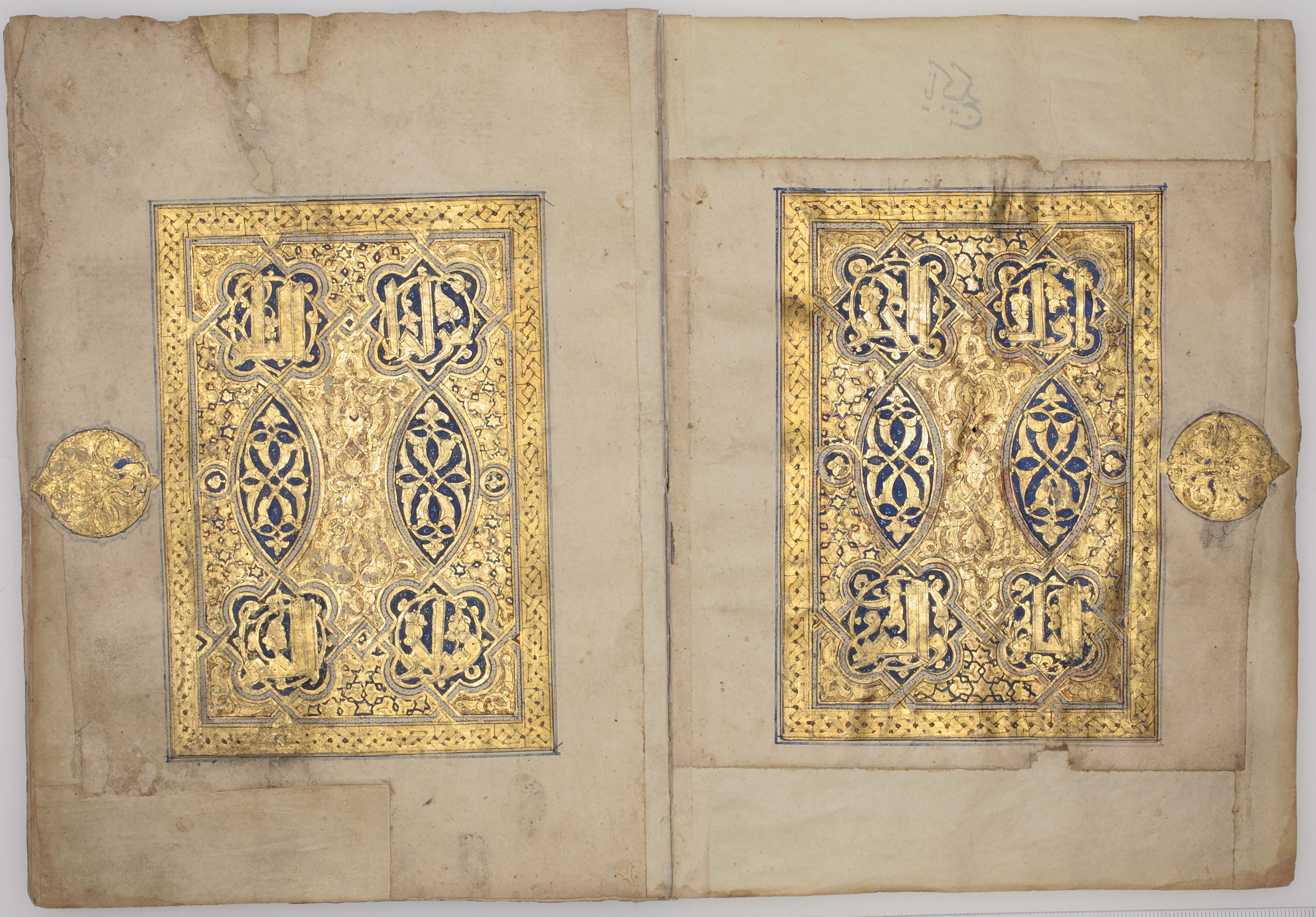
A Qur'an in the name of Zengid ruler Qutb ad-Din Muhammad (1197–1219). (Khalili QUR 497)

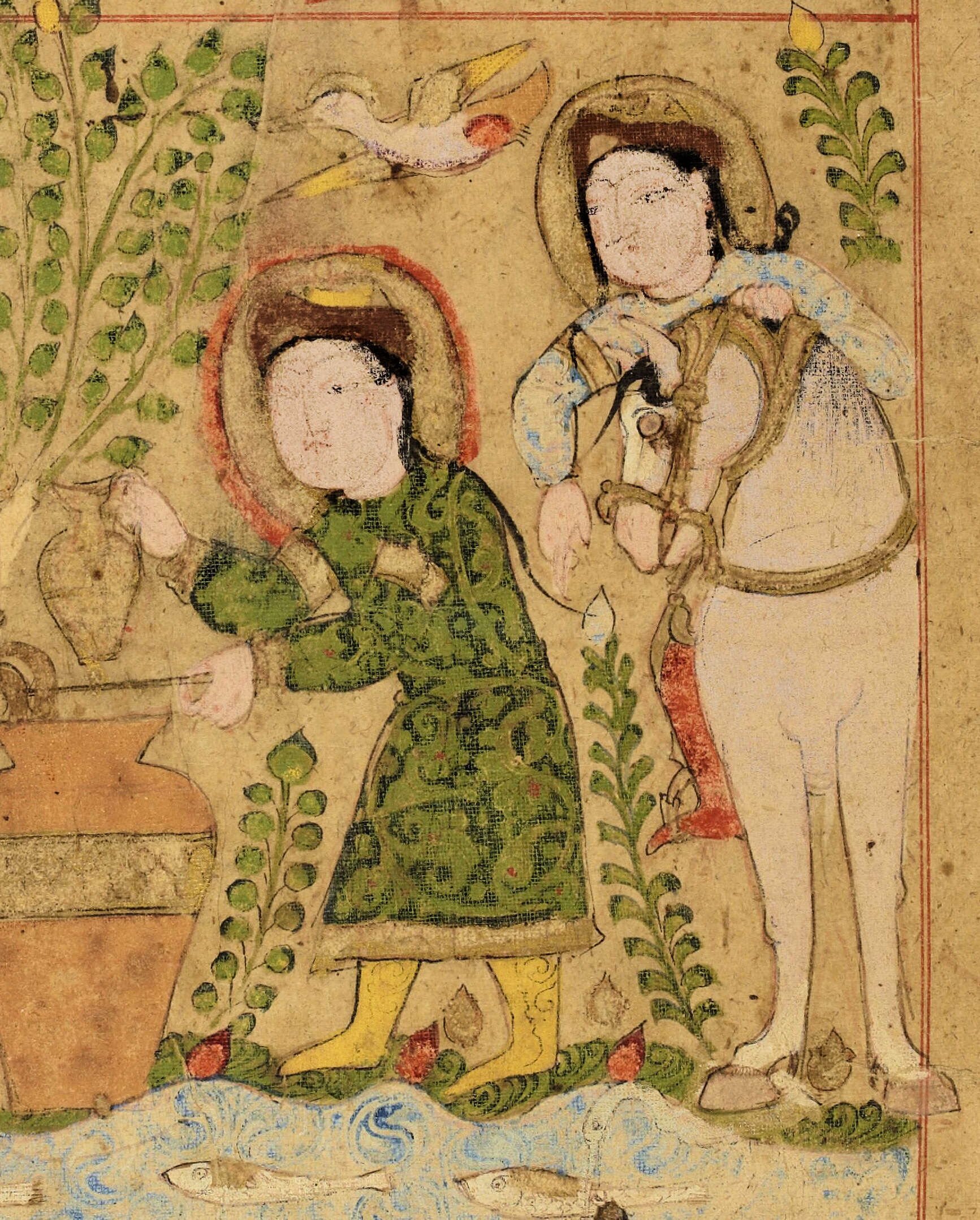
Figures in Turkic dress, with aqbiya turkiyya coat, tiraz armbands, boots and sharbush hat. Kitāb al-Diryāq, Jazira, 1198–1199 CE.

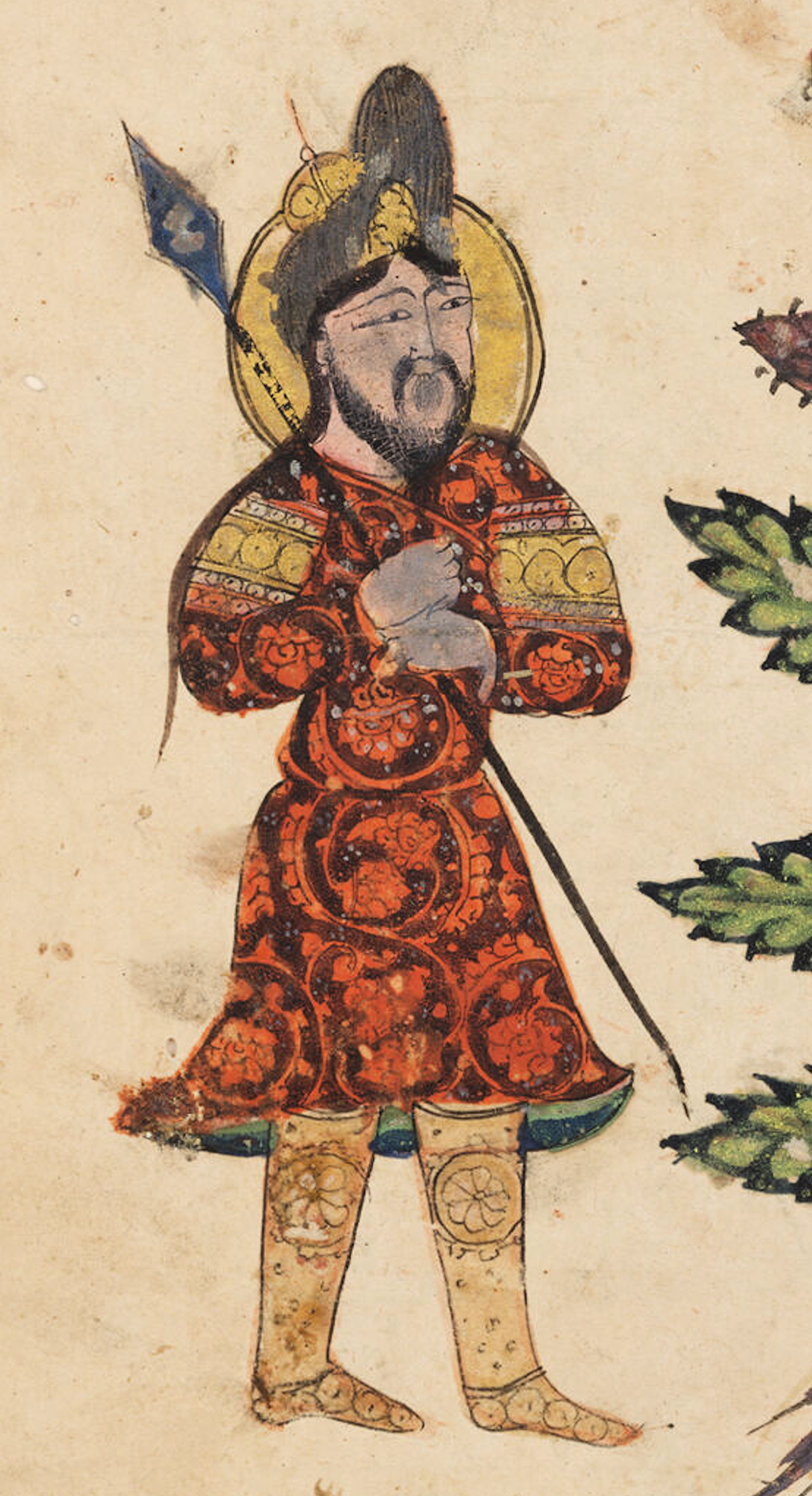
Warrior wearing the sharbush, a three-quarters length robe, and boots. De Materia Medica of Dioscorides, Iraq, 1224. Harvard Art Museums.

== Architecture ==
The Zengids are known for numerous constructions from Syria to northern Iraq. The Citadel of Aleppo was fortified by the Zengids during the Crusades. Imad ad-Din Zengi, followed by his son Nur ad-Din (ruled 1147–1174), unified Aleppo and Damascus and held back the Crusaders from their repeated assaults on the cities. In addition to his many works in both Aleppo and Damascus, Nur ad-Din rebuilt the Aleppo city walls and fortified the citadel. Arab sources report that he also made several other improvements, such as a high, brick-walled entrance ramp, a palace, and a racecourse likely covered with grass. Nur ad-Din additionally restored or rebuilt the two mosques and donated an elaborate wooden mihrab (prayer niche) to the Mosque of Abraham. Several famous crusaders were imprisoned in the citadel, among them Count of Edessa, Joscelin II, who died there, Raynald of Châtillon, and the King of Jerusalem, Baldwin II, who was held for two years.

The Nur al-Din Madrasa is a funerary madrasa in Damascus, Syria. It was built in 1167 by Nūr ad-Dīn Zangī, atabeg of Syria, who is buried there. The complex includes a mosque, a madrasa, and the mausoleum of the founder. It was the first such complex to be built in Damascus. The Nur al-Din Bimaristan is a large Muslim medieval bimaristan ("hospital") in Damascus, Syria. It was built and named after the Nur ad-Din Zangi in 1154.

The Great Mosque of al-Nuri, Mosul was also built by Nur ad-Din Zangi in 1172–1173, shortly before his death.

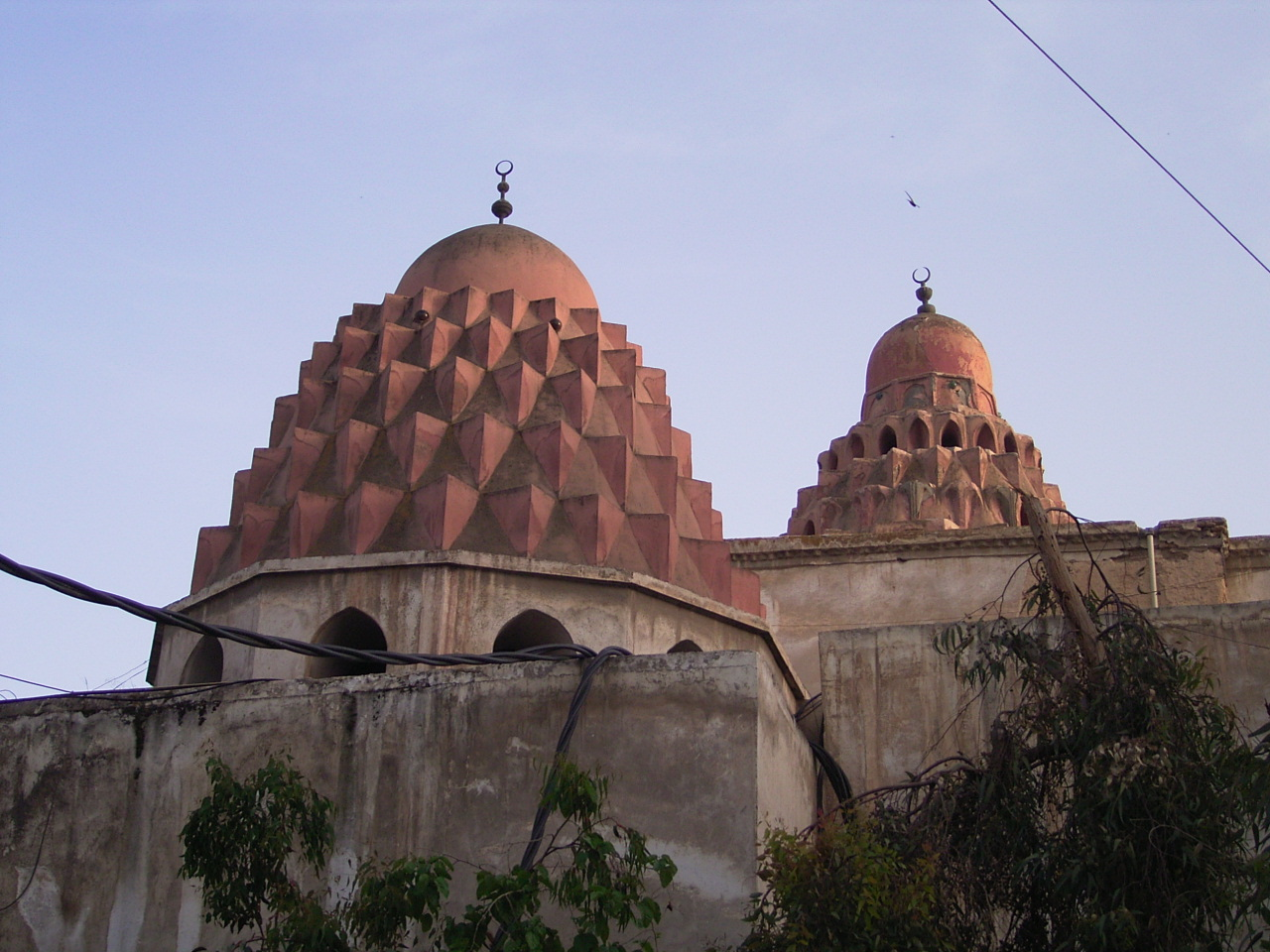
Domes of the Nur al-Din Madrasa in Damascus

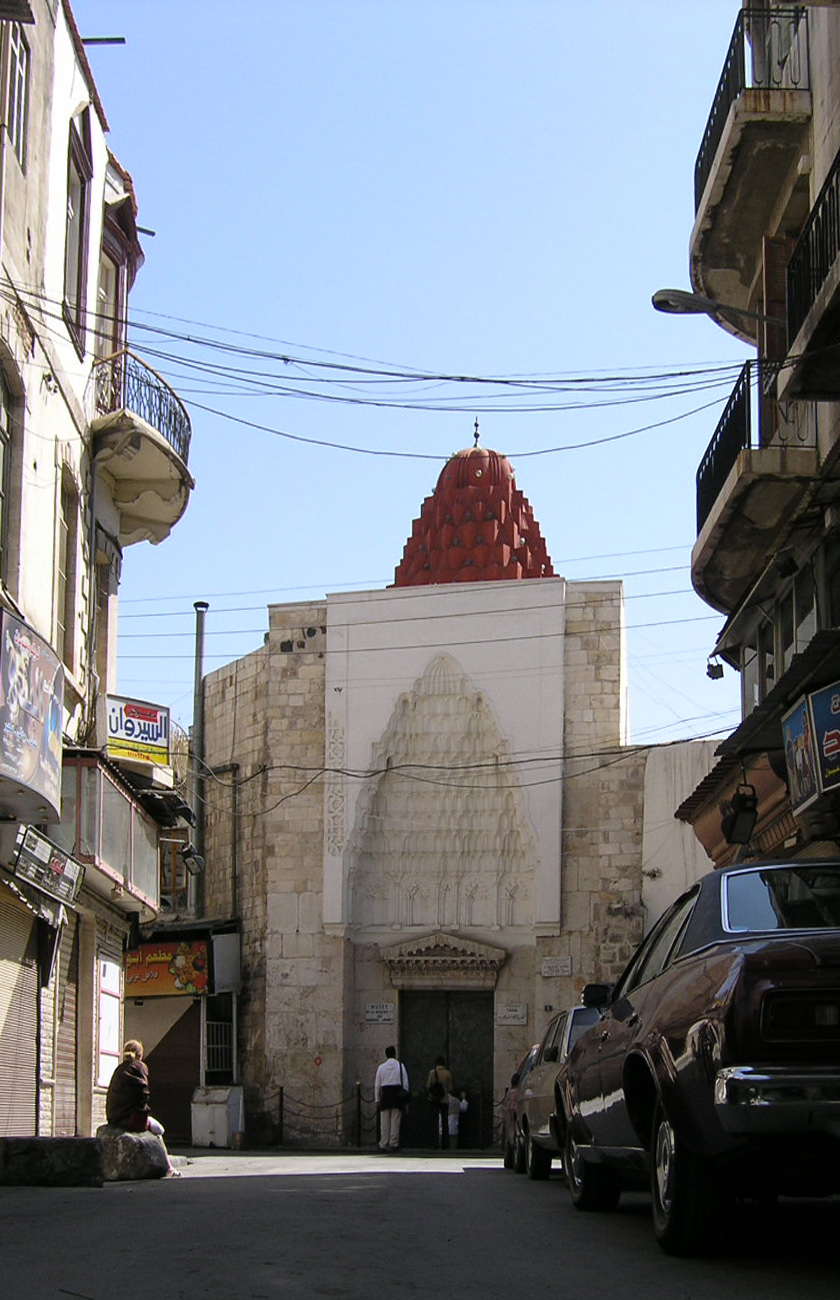
Front of the Nur al-Din Bimaristan, 1154

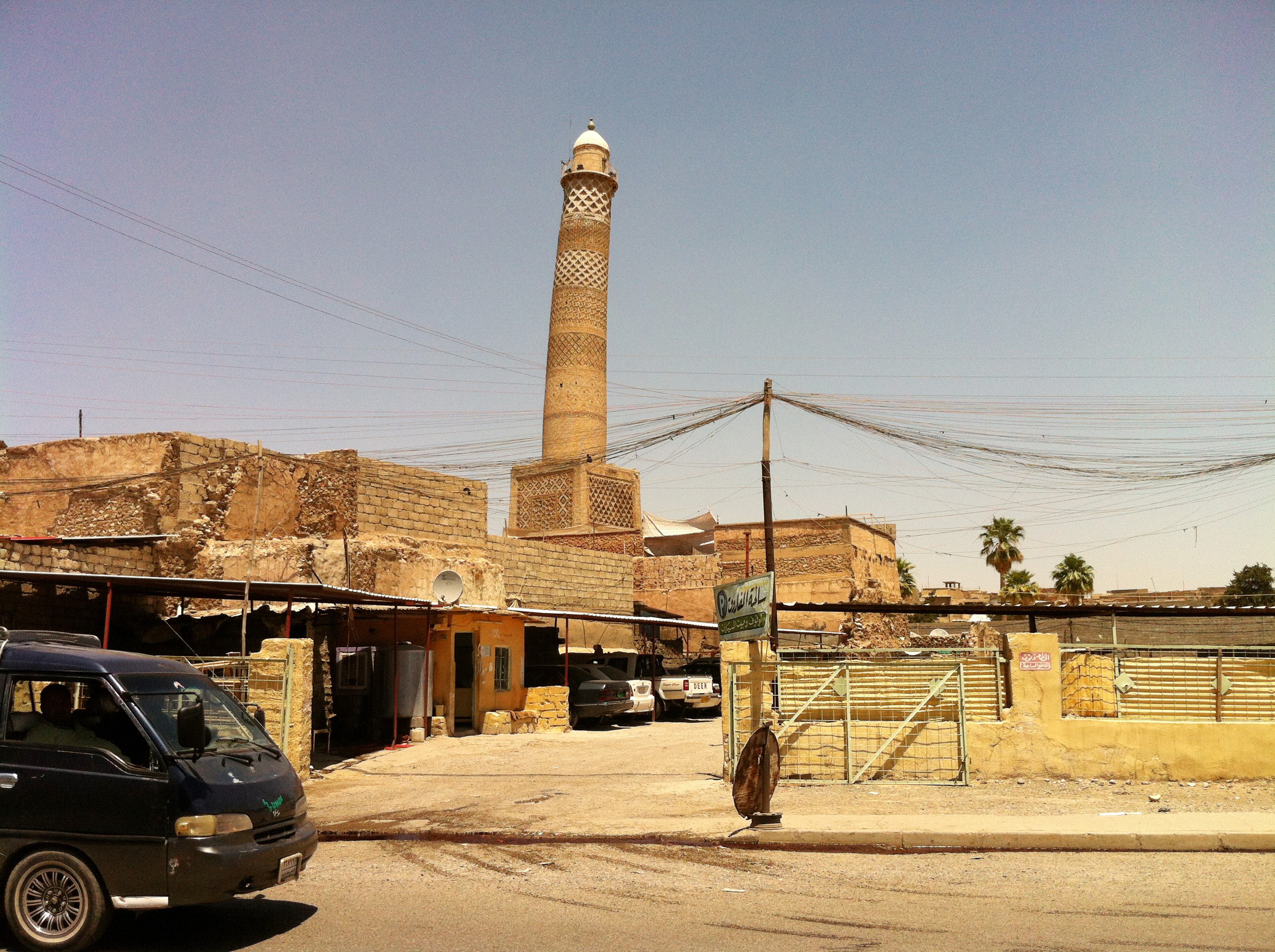
The Great Mosque of al-Nuri before its destruction in 2017

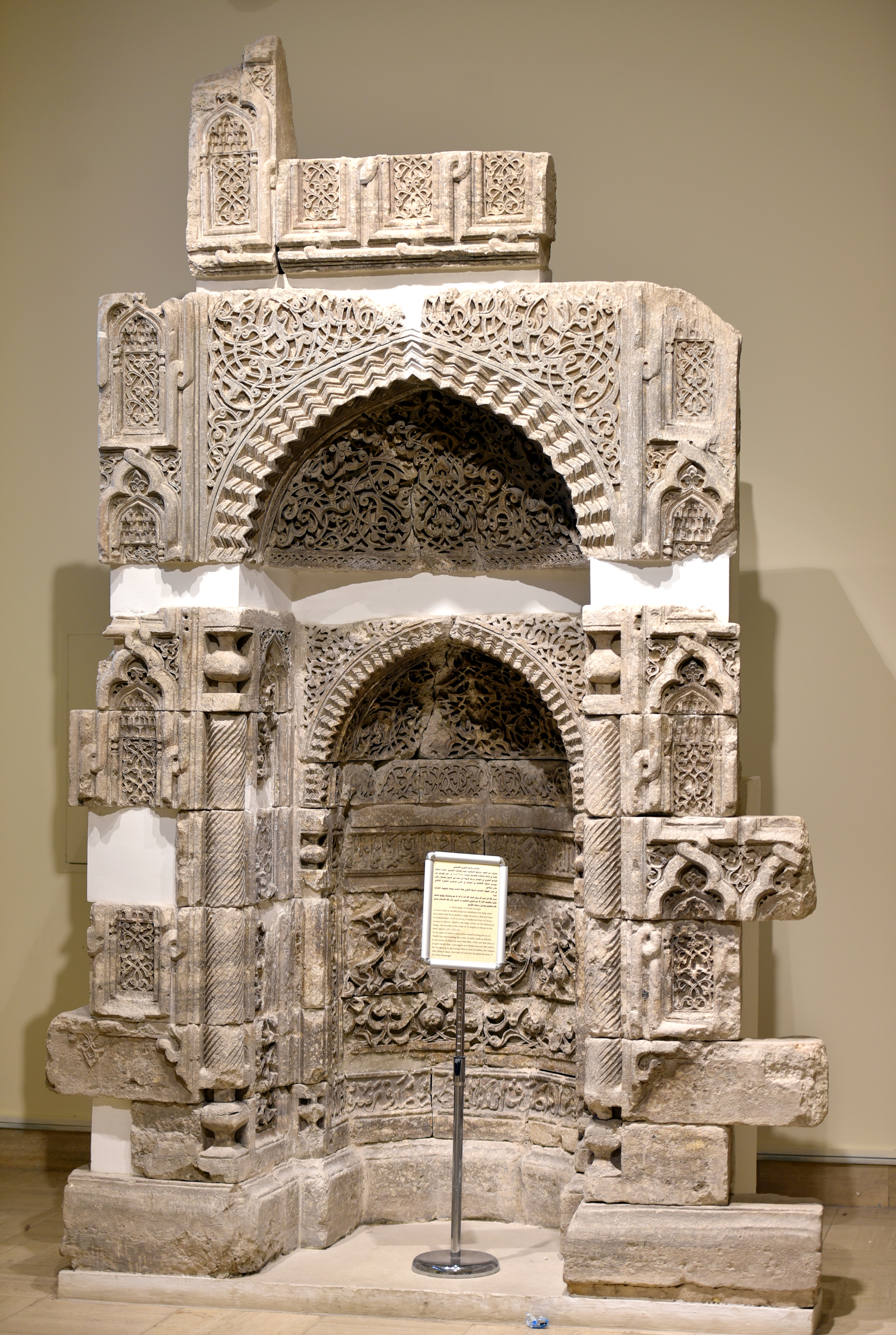
Mihrab from al-Nuri Mosque in Mosul, Iraq, built by Nur al-Din Zengi, Iraq Museum

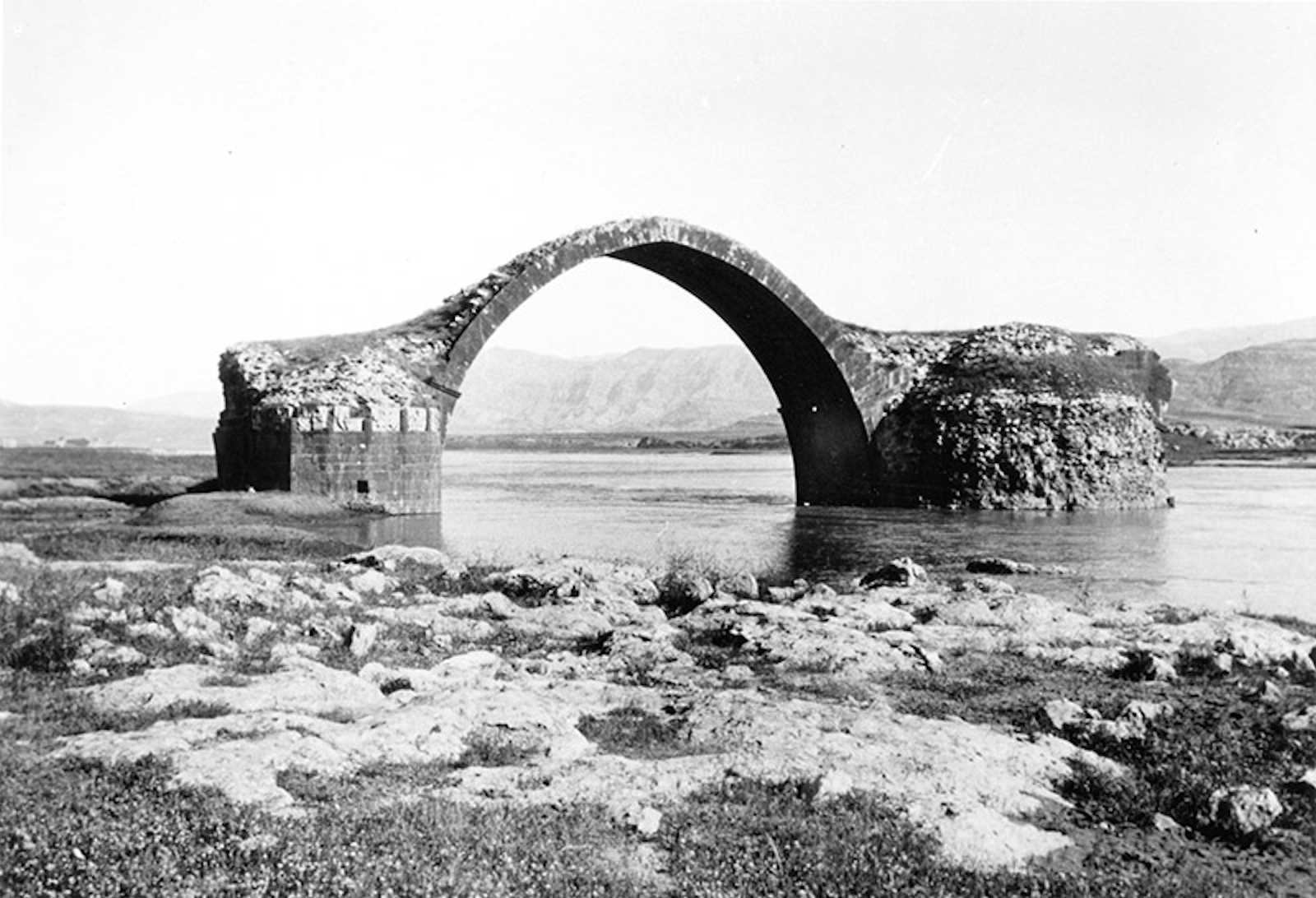
Zengid Ain Diwar Bridge. Built under Qutb al-Din Mawdud, from 1146 to 1163 CE. Cizre.

== Christianity under the Zengids ==
Christianity in the Middle East continued to suffer a general decline within a context of Arabization and Islamization, as well as the conflict of the Crusades. Still, Syriac Christianity remained active under the Zengids, and even went through a phase of "Syriac Renaissance" in which discriminatory rules against Christians were lifted, especially after the death of the conservative Nur al-Din Zengi in 1174. Several important Christian manuscripts were created in Mosul during the late Zengid period, especially under the atabagate of Badr al-Din Lu'lu' (1211–1234), and later during his independent reign (1234–1259). One of them, the Jacobite-Syrian Lectionary of the Gospels, was created at the Mar Mattai Monastery 20 kilometers northeast of the city of Mosul, c.1220 (Vatican Library, Ms. Syr. 559). This Gospel, with its depiction of many military figures in armour, is considered as a useful reference of the military technologies of classical Islam during the period. Another such gospel is Ms. Additional 7170, British Library, also created circa 1220 in the Mosul region.

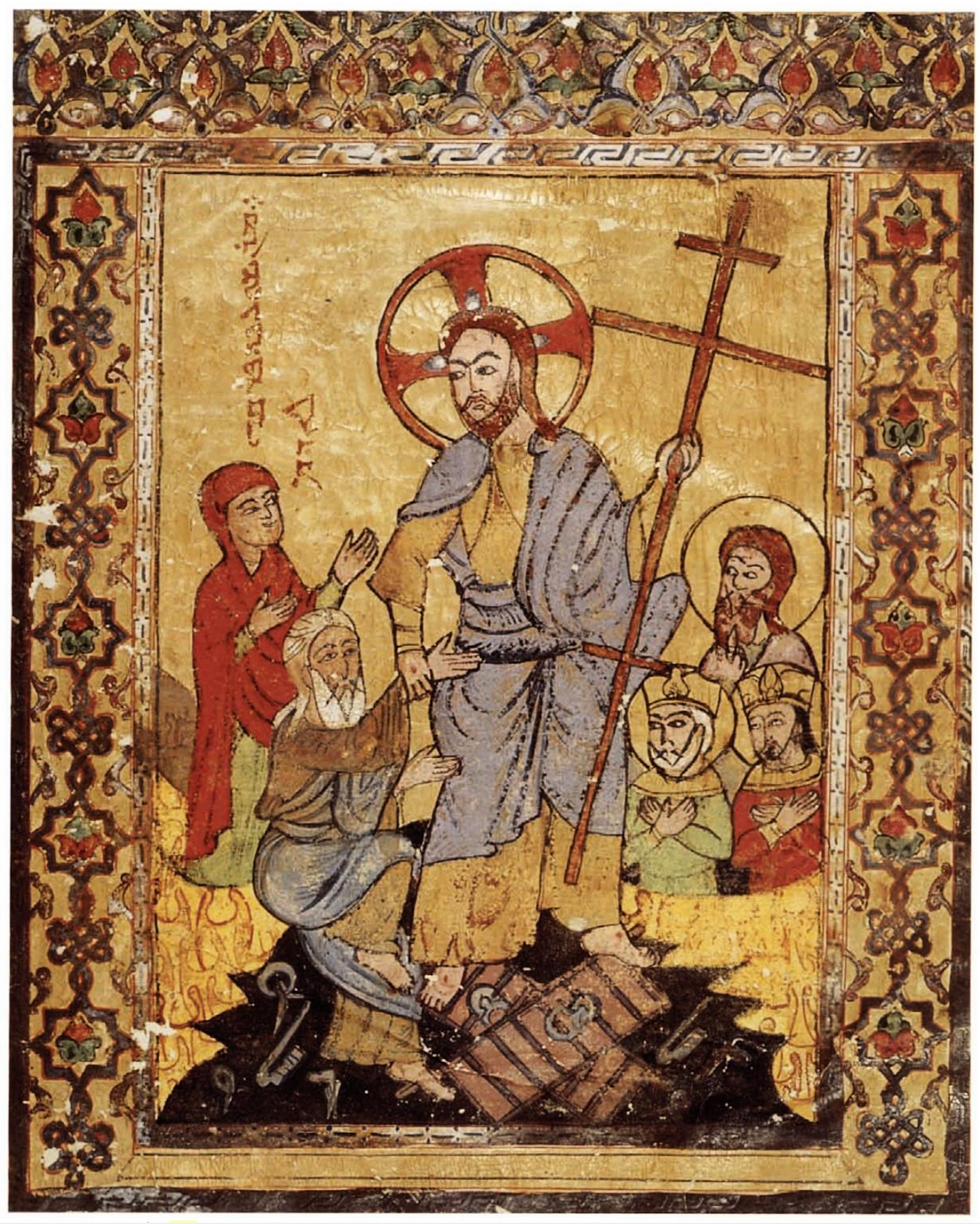
Miniature of a Syriac gospel from around Mosul, c. 1220 (BL Ms. 7170). Badr al-Din Lu'lu' was tolerant of Christian religion.

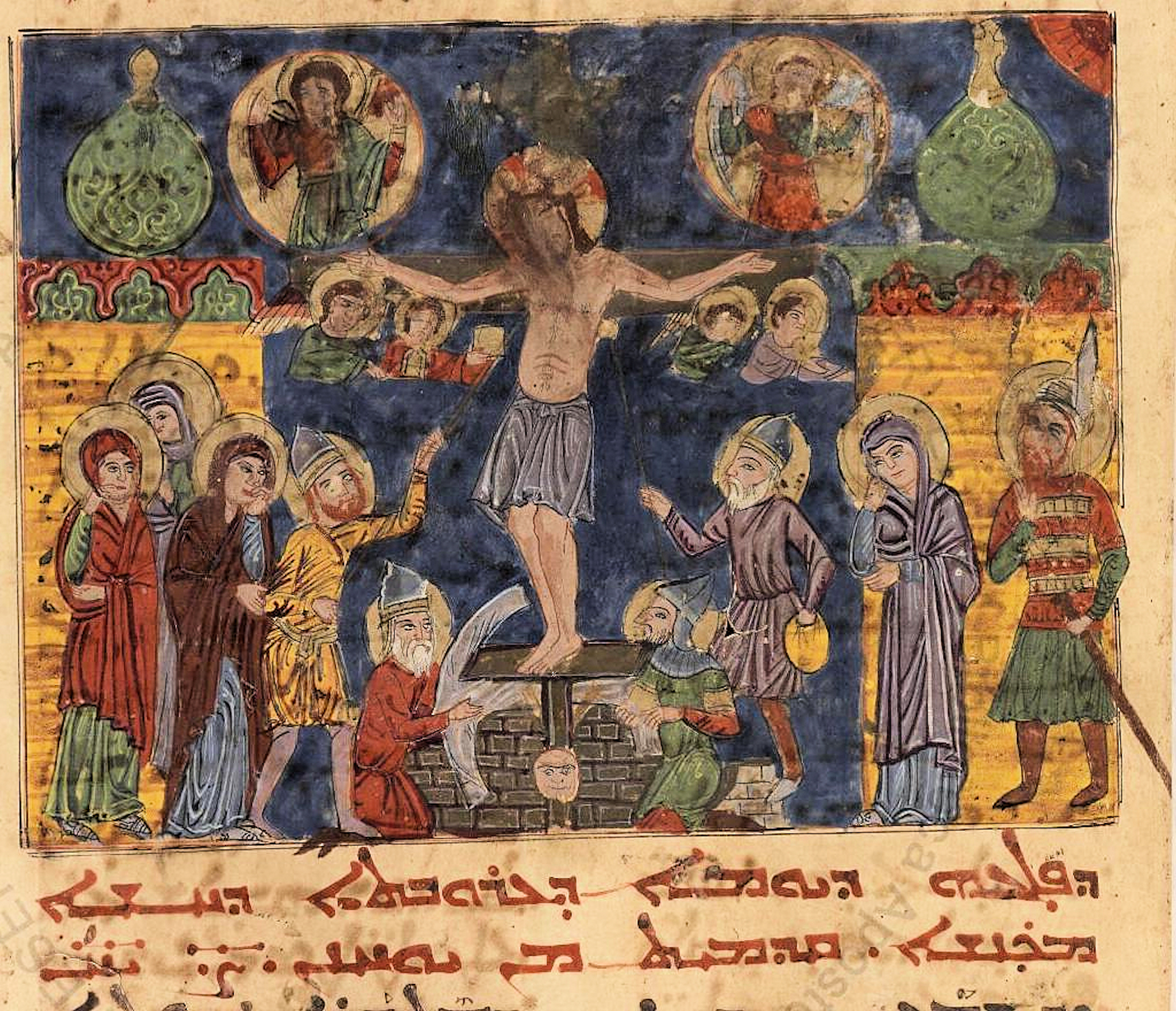
Detail of f.139r, Crucifixion. Vatican Library, Ms. Syr. 559.

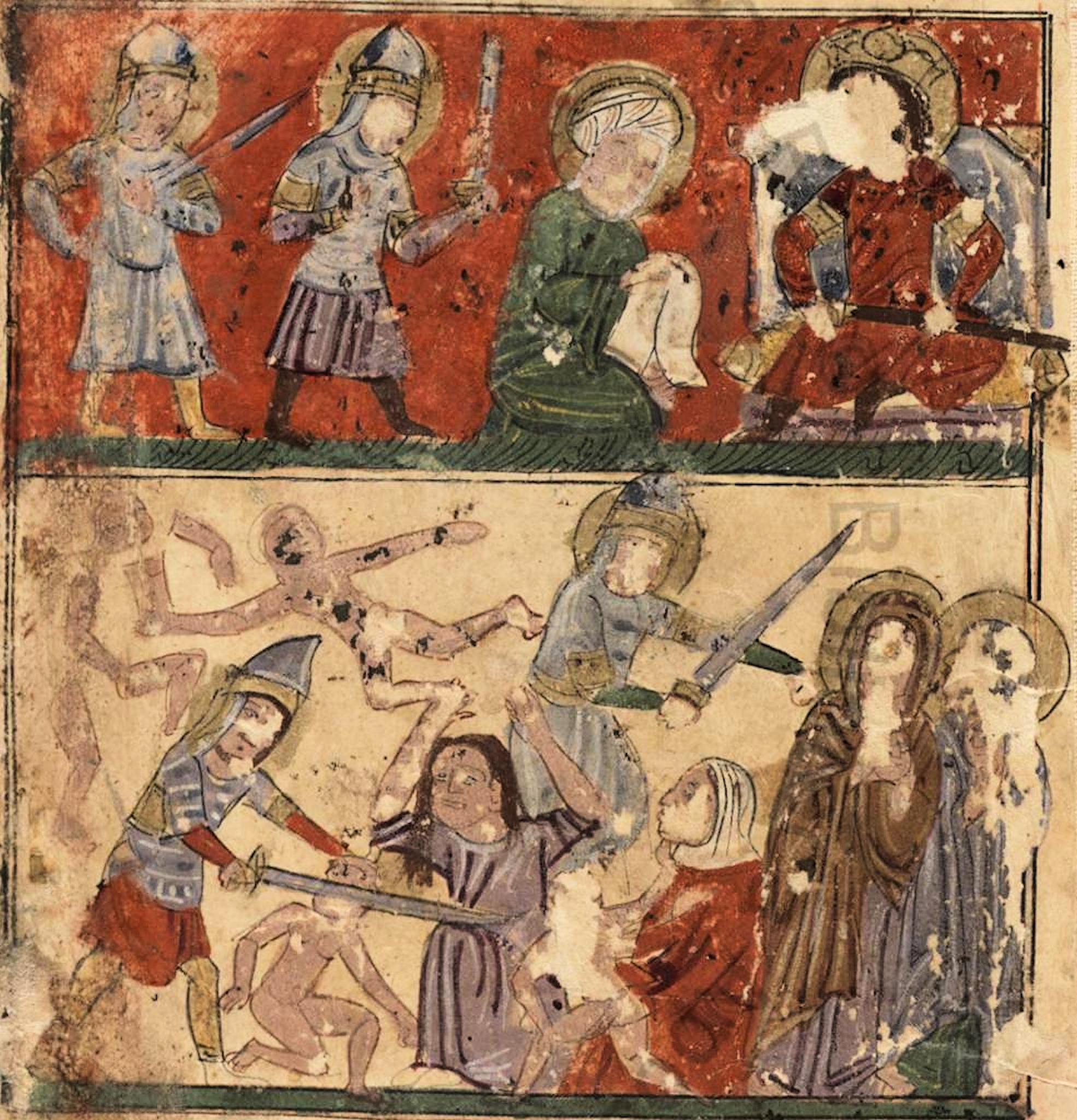
Detail of f.18r, Massacre of the Innocents. Vatican Library, Ms. Syr. 559.

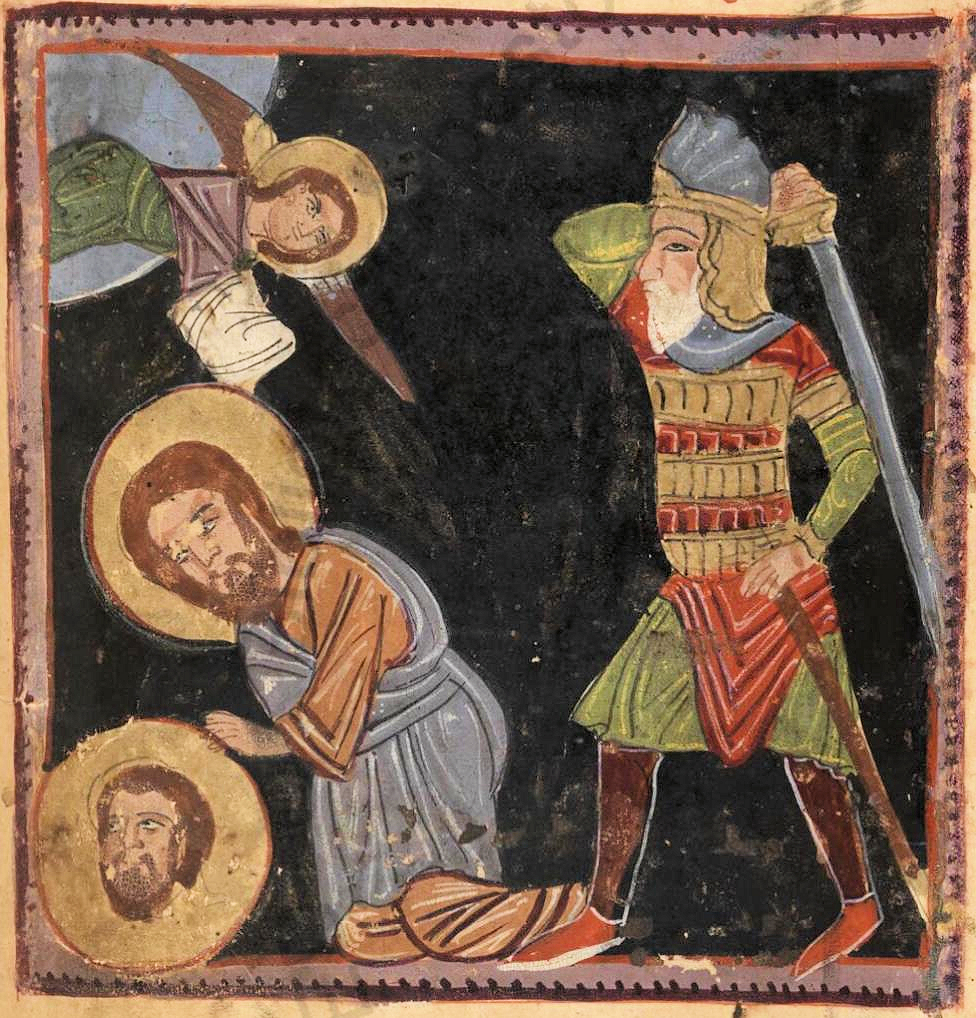
Detail of f.29v, Beheading of John the Baptist. Vatican Library, Ms. Syr. 559.

== Zengid rulers ==
The Zengids branched out in several regions between Syria and Iraq.

=== Zengid Atabegs and Emirs of Mosul ===
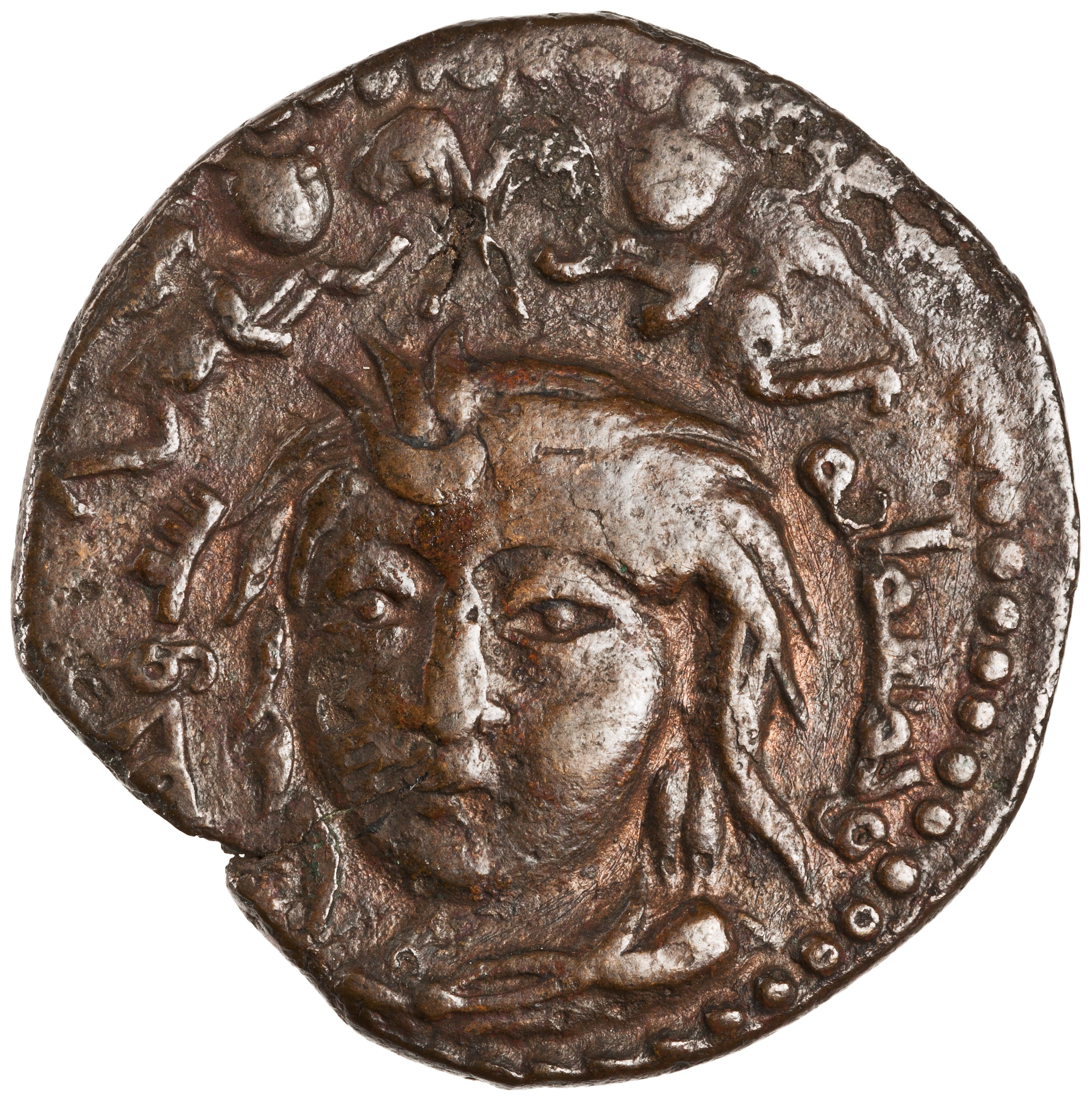
Coin of Qutb al-Din Mawdud (r. 1149–1170), son of the founder of the dynasty Zengi. Dated AH 556 (1160–1161 CE).

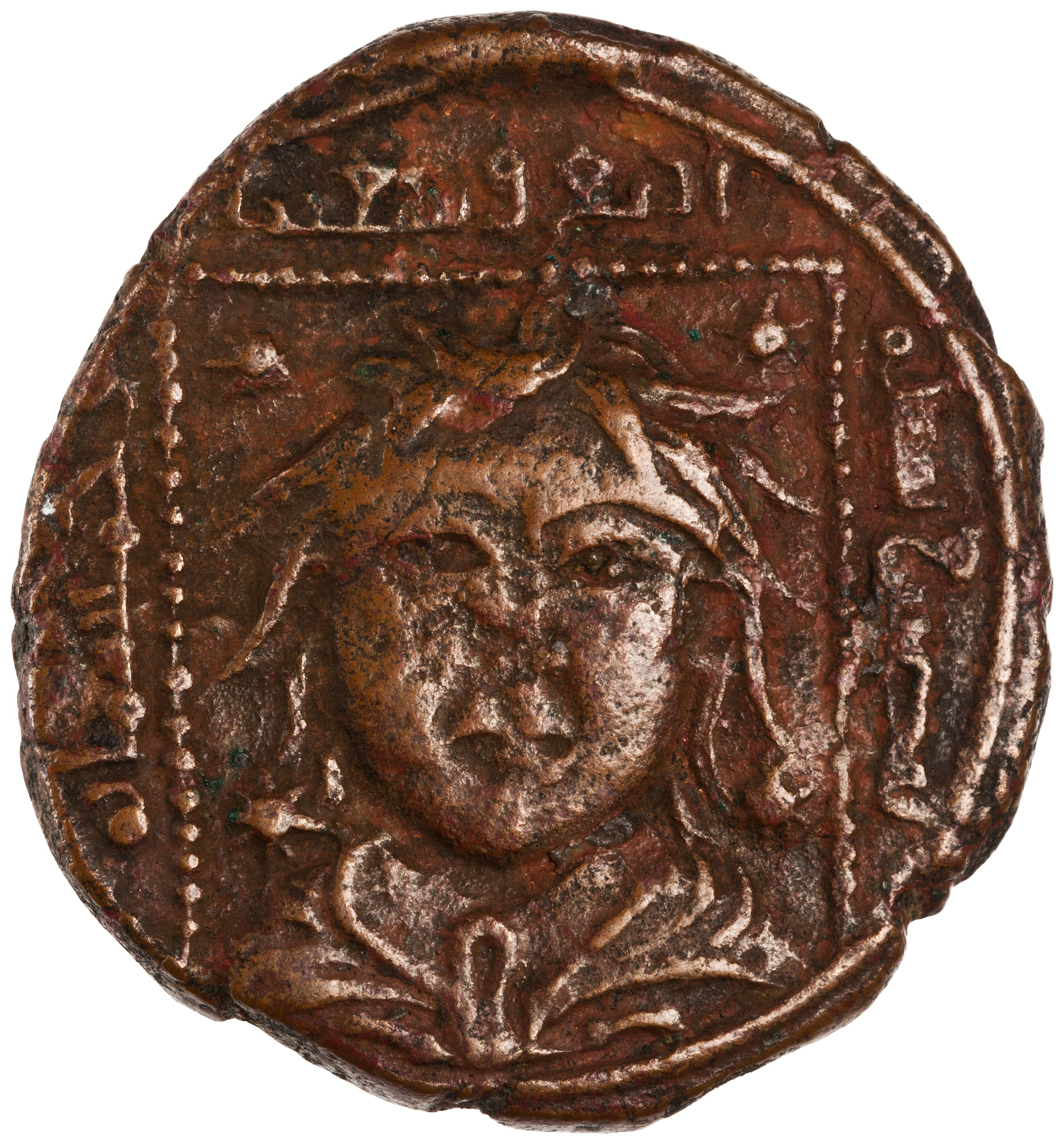
Nur al-Din Arslan Shah I, Nisibin, 594 H (1197–1198 CE)

- Zengi, 1127–1146
- Sayf al-Din Ghazi I, son of Zengi, 1146–1149
- Qutb al-Din Mawdud, son of Zengi, 1149–1170
- Sayf al-Din Ghazi II, son of Qutb al-Din Mawdud, 1170–1180
- Izz al-Din Mas'ud, son of Qutb al-Din Mawdud, 1180–1193
- Nur al-Din Arslan Shah I, son of Izz al-Din Mas'ud, 1193–1211
- Izz al-Din Mas'ud II, son of Nur al-Din Arslan Shah I, 1211–1218 (regency by Badr al-Din Lu'lu')
- Nur al-Din Arslan Shah II, son of Izz al-Din Mas'ud II, 1218–1219 (regency by Badr al-Din Lu'lu')
- Nasir ad-Din Mahmud, son of Izz al-Din Mas'ud II, 1219–1234 (regency by Badr al-Din Lu'lu')

Mosul was taken over by Badr al-Din Lu'lu', atabeg to Nasir ad-Din Mahmud, whom he murdered in 1234.

=== Zengid Emirs of Aleppo ===
- Zengi, 1128–1146
- Nur al-Din, son of Zengi, 1146–1174
- As-Salih Ismail al-Malik, son of Nur al-Din, 1174–1182
- Imad al-Din Zengi II, 1182

Aleppo was conquered by Saladin in 1183 and ruled by Ayyubids until 1260.

=== Zengid Emirs of Damascus ===
- Nur al-Din, son of Zengi, 1154–1174
- As-Salih Ismail al-Malik, son of Nur al-Din, 1174.

Damascus was conquered by Saladin in 1174 and ruled by Ayyubids until 1260.

=== Zengid Emirs of Sinjar ===
- Imad al-Din Zengi II, son of Qutb al-Din Mawdud, 1171–1197
- Qutb ad-Din Muhammad, son of Zengi II, 1197–1219
- Imad al-Din Shahanshah, son of Qutb ad-Din Muhammad, 1219–1220
- Jalal al-Din Mahmud (co-ruler), son of Qutb ad-Din Muhammad, 1219–1220
- Fath al-Din Umar (co-ruler), son of Qutb ad-Din Muhammad, 1219–1220.

Sinjar was taken by the Ayyubids in 1182, and ruled by al-Ashraf Musa in 1220, Ayyubid emir of Diyar Bakr. It later came under the control of Badr al-Din Lu'lu', ruler of Mosul beginning in 1234.

=== Zengid Emirs of al-Jazira (in Northern Iraq) ===
- Mu'izz al-Din Sanjar Shah, son of Sayf al-Din Ghazi II, 1180–1208
- Mu'izz al-Din Mahmud, son of Mu'izz al-Din Sanjar Shah, 1208–1241
- Mahmud al-Malik al-Zahir, son of Mu'izz al-Din Mahmud, 1241–1250.

In 1250, al-Jazira fell under the domination of an-Nasir Yusuf, Ayyubid emir of Aleppo.

=== Zengid Emirs of Shahrazur ===
Emirs of Shahrizor in Kurdistan:

Saladin conquers all lands of Shahrazur and beyond lesser Zab in 1185. Thus the Ayyubids became the rulers of most of Southern Kurdistan.

== Genealogy of House of Zangi ==
House of Zangi

Zengid Emirate
Zengid Emirate of Mosul
Zengid Emirate of Aleppo
Zengid Emirate of Damascus
Zengid Emirate of Sinjar
Zengid Emirate of Jazirah

Zangi r. 1127–1146
Ghazi I r. 1146–1149	Mahmud r. 1146–1174 r. 1154–1174	Maw'dud r. 1149–1170
Isma'il r. 1174–1182 r. 1174–1174	Ghazi II r. 1170–1180	Mas'ud I r. 1180–1193	Zangi r. 1171–1197 r. 1182–1182
Sanjar-Shah r. 1180–1208	Arslan-Shah I r. 1193–1211	Muhammad r. 1197–1219
Mahmud I r. 1208–1241	Mas'ud II r. 1211–1218	Shahanshah r. 1219–1220	Mahmud r. 1219–1220	Umar r. 1219–1220
Mahmud II r. 1241–1250	Arslan-Shah II r. 1218–1219	Mahmud r. 1219–1234

== Flag ==
Supposed flag of Saladin, inherited from the Zengids.

The flag of Saladin (yellow, emblazed with an eagle) was apparently inherited from the Zengids. The color yellow especially, remained a symbolical color for the rulers of the Ayyubids and the Mamluks.

== See also ==
- List of Emirs of Mosul
- List of Sunni Muslim dynasties
- Palmer Cup

== Sources ==
- Asbridge, Thomas (2012). The Crusades: The War for the Holy Land. Simon & Schuster.
- Ayalon, David (1999). Eunuchs, Caliphs and Sultans: A Study in Power Relationships. Hebrew University Magnes Press.
- Bosworth, C.E. (1996). The New Islamic Dynasties: A Chronological and Genealogical Manual. New York: Columbia University Press.
- Canby, Sheila R.; Beyazit, Deniz; Rugiadi, Martina; Peacock, A. C. S. (27 April 2016). Court and Cosmos: The Great Age of the Seljuqs. Metropolitan Museum of Art. ISBN 978-1-58839-589-4.
- El-Azhari, Taef (1 August 2019). "The Seljuqs from Syria to Iran: The Age of Khatuns and Atabegs". Queens, Eunuchs and Concubines in Islamic History, 661-1257. Edinburg University Press. pp. 285–348. doi:10.3366/edinburgh/9781474423182.003.0007. ISBN 978-1-4744-2318-2.
- Gonella, Julia (2005). Die Zitadelle von Aleppo und der Tempel des Wettergottes. Rhema-Verlag, Münster. ISBN 978-3-930454-44-0.
- Humphreys, Stephen (1977). From Saladin to the Mongols: The Ayyubids of Damascus, 1193-1260. SUNY Press. ISBN 978-0-87395-263-7.
- Humphreys, R.S. (1991). "Masūd b. Mawdūd b. Zangī". In Bosworth, C. E.; van Donzel, E. & Pellat, Ch. (eds.). The Encyclopaedia of Islam, Second Edition. Volume VI: Mahk–Mid. Leiden: E. J. Brill. pp. 780–782. ISBN 978-90-04-08112-3.
- Hunyadi, Zsolt; Laszlovszky, József (2001). The Crusades and the Military Orders. Central European University.
- Irwin, Robert (1999). "Islam and the Crusades 1096-1699". In Riley-Smith, Jonathan (ed.). The Oxford History of the Crusades. Oxford University Press.
- Lane-Poole, Stanley (1906). Saladin and the Fall of the Kingdom of Jerusalem. Heroes of the Nations. London: G. P. Putnam's Sons.
- Lyons, Malcolm Cameron; Jackson, D. E. P. (1982). Saladin: The Politics of the Holy War. Cambridge: Cambridge University Press. ISBN 0521317398.
- Stevenson, William Barron (1907). The Crusaders in the East. Cambridge University Press.
- Taef El-Azharii (2006). Zengi and the Muslim Response to the Crusades, Routledge, Abington, UK.
