= Nur al-Din Bimaristan =

Nur al-Din Hospital (Bimaristan)
- Entrance gate of the bimaristan, with the exterior of the muqarnas dome visible above

Geography
- Location: al-Hariqa quarter, Damascus, Syria
- Coordinates: 33°30′37″N 36°18′13″E

Organisation
- Religious affiliation: Muslim
- Patron: Sultan Nur ad-Din

History
- Constructed: 1154, 1244, 1975
- Opened: 1154
- Closed: 1975

Links
- Lists: Hospitals in Syria

Nur al-Din Bimaristan (Arabic: البيمارستان النوري) is a large Muslim medieval bimaristan ("hospital") in Damascus, Syria. It is located in the al-Hariqa quarter in the old walled city, to the southwest of the Umayyad Mosque. It was built and named after the Zengid Sultan Nur ad-Din in 1154, and later an extension was added to the main building in 1242 by a physician Badr al-Din. It was restored in 1975 and now houses the Museum of Medicine and Science in the Arab World.

Constructed in two phases the first construction phase was commissioned by Nur al-Din in 1154 CE and the second phase was about 90 years later and was commissioned by a physician, Badr al-Din, circa 1242 CE. It was renovated in 1975 and a small museum was established here.

== See also ==
- Nur al-Din Madrasa
