= Qara Saray =

Palace complex in Mosul

Coordinates: 36.3528°N 43.1257°E

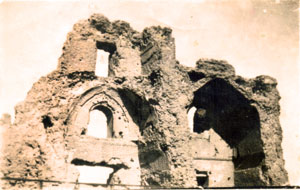
Qara Saray (قرهسرتي)

Qara Saray, meaning “The Black Palace,” was a palace complex in Mosul located on the west bank of the Tigris River. It was built by Badr al-Din Lu’lu (died 1259), mamluk emir of the Zengid dynasty, who ruled what is now northern Iraq during the thirteenth century, and who had a significant long-term impact on the history of Mosul. Significant parts of the structure of Qara Saray remained by the 1980s, although it suffered damage during the Iran-Iraq War. Unlike many other historic sites in Mosul, such as al-Nuri Mosque and Mar Girgis Church, Qara Saray did not experience further destruction during the period of occupation by the Islamic State of Syria and the Levant (ISIL) from 2014 to 2017. However, like many other structures damaged in Mosul during ISIL's occupation, Qara Saray became a focus of heritage conservation efforts supported by NGO’s in partnership with Iraqi government agencies and institutions after 2017.

== Early history ==
Qara Saray was built for Badr al-Din Lu’lu, a mamluk or slave soldier who rose to power in Mosul after the year 1211 when he became Atabeg in charge of raising the sons of the local Zengid emirs. He eventually took power and began to rule Mosul on his own. During his tenure, he built many major structures including the Sinjar Gate and the shrines of Imam Yahya and Awn al-Din. One of his major structures was the palace complex, Qara Saray. In 1244, Lu’lu surrendered to the Mongols led by Hulagu Khan. Although the surrender saved the city from destruction, it suffered minor damage. According to legend, Qara Saray was originally known as Ak Saray, meaning the White Palace. During the initial Mongol assault, the burning of the palace turned its exterior color from white to black, prompting it to be known as Qara Saray.

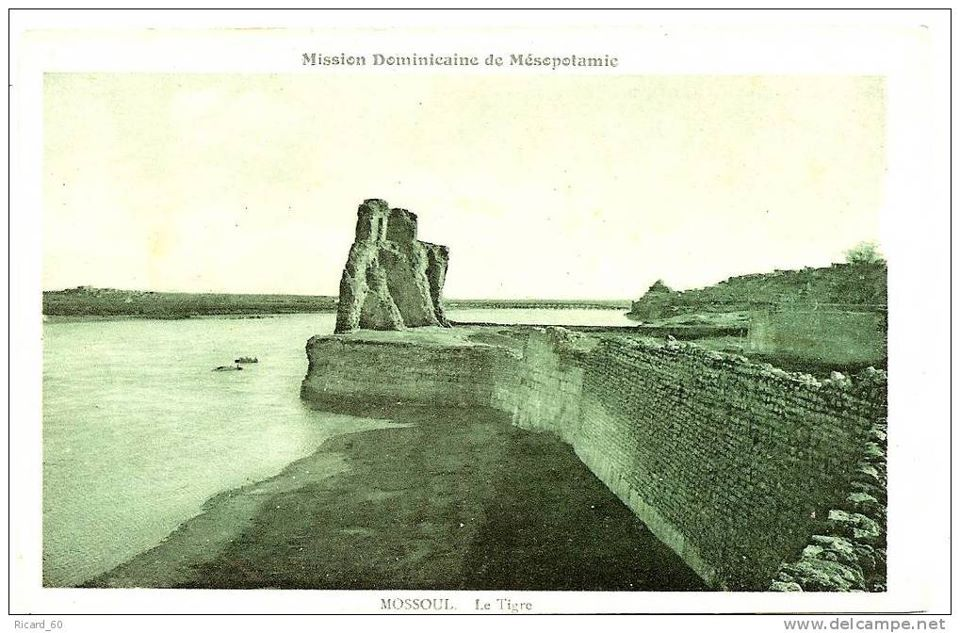
Postcard of Qara Saray (قره سرا)

== Architectural design and construction ==
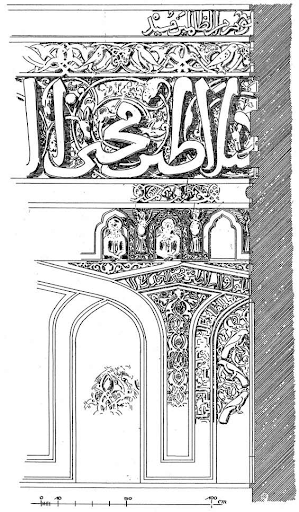
Arabic Inscription inside Qara Saray from Herzfeld and Sarre's architectural survey

A 1910 architectural survey by Ernst Herzfeld, a German archeologist specializing in Near Eastern studies, and Friedrich Paul Theodor Sarre, a German art historian, showed that Qara Saray was made of quarried limestone covered in plaster. It had long external rampart walls for defensive purposes. Traditional brick techniques were used as the primary foundation for the structure. The stucco interior decorations were paired with ornate vaulting in the ceilings known as muqarnas which provided support and ornamental enhancement.

The interiors contained elaborate decorations and pointed arches that were covered in arabesque designs and vegetal and animal motifs. These included depictions of birds (spread-winged eagles) and snakes, which may have reflected Christian influence in the region or which may have signaled that the large interior courtyards were used for secular gatherings and not for devotional use. The presence of animal depictions suggest the space was not used for prayer. The interior arches are pointed or trilobed, with the spaces between the arches filled with floral detailing, creating intricate friezes. The facades also contain repeating geometric patterns with Arabic calligraphy. The presence of the naskhi (as opposed to kufic) style of Arabic script, according to the British archaeologist and scholar of Islamic architecture, Dorothy Lamb, may have reflected recent Central Asian influences.

== Late twentieth-century history ==
Some restoration of the site occurred during the late 1960s, during which the remnants of the wall on the interior side were extended in order to protect the rest of the site. Furthermore, during this restoration, an overhead concrete slab was installed to protect against the rain. However, despite these efforts, the remnants of the Qara Saray remained in very poor condition, with the site’s decorations having lost much of their clarity and the plasterwork – due to its continual exposure to wind and poor protection from infiltration – gradually coming away. Additionally, the Qara Saray continued to struggle structurally in the middle to late twentieth century, given that the restoration additions quickly began to crack and the overhead rain protection slab was proven ineffective.

Between February 1984 and February 1988, Iraq engaged in a series of five air raids against various major Iranian cities, often in response to Iranian aggression. These raids during the Iran-Iraq war are known as the War of the Cities. After the fifth and final raid of the War of the Cities, the Imperial Iranian Air Force (IIAF) retaliated by striking military targets near Mosul. This damaged and destroyed numerous nearby cultural sites, including the Qara Saray. The damage that the site underwent during these air raids, coupled with the structural struggles that the building was already battling throughout the 1960s and 70s left the Qara Saray in very poor condition at the end of the twentieth century.

== Post-ISIL reconstruction efforts ==
After the end of ISIL’s occupation of Northern Iraq in 2017, international efforts and funding increased to promote the reconstruction of Mosul’s heritage sites, including Qara Saray. Efforts have focused on repairing six historical sites in Iraq with funding from NGOs and global philanthropies such as the International Alliance for the Protection of Heritage in Conflict Areas (ALEPH) and the Gerda Henkel Foundation. In 2021, the U.S. State Department awarded the University of Pennsylvania substantial funds to support heritage projects in northern Iraq through the Iraq Heritage Stabilization Program (IHSP) in coordination with the University of Mosul’s Engineering Consulting Bureau.
