= Gökböri =

General of Saladin, ruler of Erbil and founder of the Ceremony of Mawlid (1154–1233)

Muzaffar ad-Din Gökböri
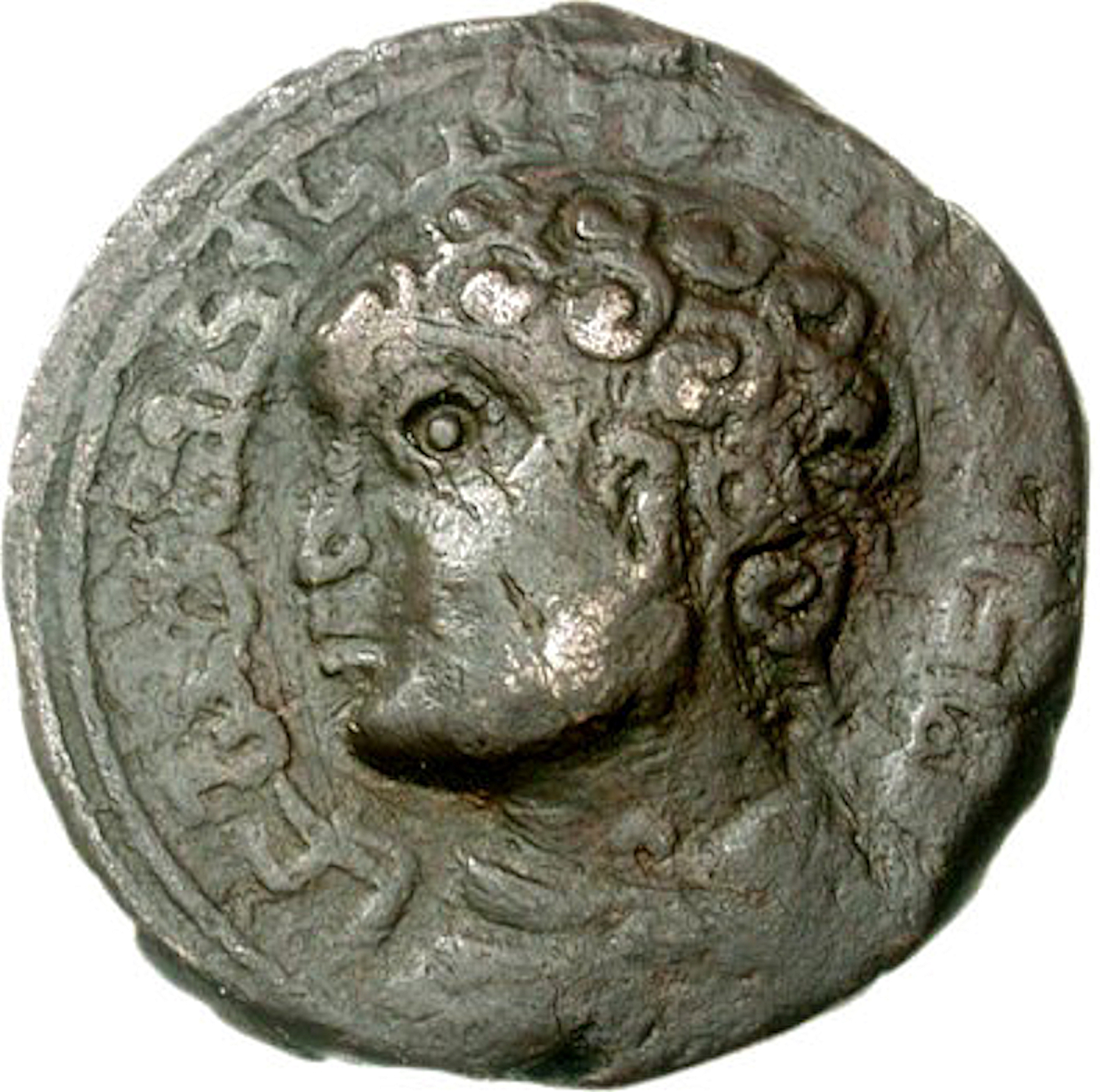
- Muzaffar al-Din Gökböri. AH 563-630 (AD 1167-1233). Arbil mint. Dated AH 587 (AD 1191-2). Bareheaded and draped bust left; name and titles of Muzaffar al-Din Gökböri in outer margin.
- Born: 13 April 1154; Mosul, Zengid Atabegate
- Died: 28 June 1233 (aged 78); Balad, Abbasid Caliphate
- Burial place: Kufa
- Military career
- Allegiance: Zengids; Ayyubids; Abbasids
- Rank: Emir
- Commands: General commanding armies and divisions of armies. Governor of various cities and regions. Lord of Erbil
- Conflicts: Battle of the Horns of Hama; Battle of Belvoir Castle; Battle of Cresson; Battle of Hattin; Third Crusade; Siege of Acre

Gökböri (Note: Also rendered Gokbori and Kukburi) (13 April 1154 – 28 June 1233) or Muzaffar ad-Din Gökböri, (Note: Full praise names: al-Malik al-Muazzam (the Exalted Prince) Muzaffar ad-Din (the Triumphant in the Faith)) was a leading emir and general of Sultan Saladin (Ṣalāḥ ad-Dīn Yūsuf ibn Ayyūb), and ruler of Erbil. He served both the Zengid and Ayyubid rulers of Syria and Egypt. He played a pivotal role in Saladin's conquest of Northern Syria and the Jazira (Upper Mesopotamia) and later held major commands in a number of battles against the Crusader states and the forces of the Third Crusade.

Gökböri was the first Muslim ruler to publicly celebrate the birth of Islamic prophet Muhammad, this ceremony included the recitation of poetry honouring Mawlid (the Prophet's Birthday).

== Origins and early life ==
Gökböri, whose name means "Blue-wolf" in Old Turkic, was the son of Zain ad-Din Ali Kutchek, the Emir of Erbil (known as Arbela in contemporary Arab usage). Gökböri's ancestry was Turcoman and his family, known as the Begtegīnids, were associated with the Seljuk Turks. On the death of his father, in August 1168, the fourteen-year-old Gökböri succeeded to the lordship of Erbil. However, the atabeg of Erbil, Kaimaz, deposed Gökböri in favour of his younger brother, Gökböri, exiled from his city, eventually took service with the Zengid prince Sayf al-Din Ghazi II of Mosul. The lord of Mosul granted Gökböri the city of Harran as a fief.

== Prominent Zengid military commander ==
During the decade from 1164, Saladin, originally a subject of Nur ad-Din the Zengid ruler of Syria, had made himself master of Egypt. Saladin was ambitious to unite Egypt and Syria under his own rule, and was asserting a level of independence that his titular master, Nur ad-Din, could not accept. In 1174 Nur ad-Din prepared his army to march on Egypt, but he died before he could move against Saladin. Following the death of Nur ad-Din, Saladin invaded Syria. Gökböri commanded the right wing of the Zengid army defeated by Saladin on 13 April 1175 at the Horns of Hama. During the battle the right wing of the Zengid army broke Saladin's left flank, before being routed in turn by a charge of Saladin's guard.

== Aids Saladin's conquest of Northern Syria and the Jazira (Upper Mesopotamia) ==
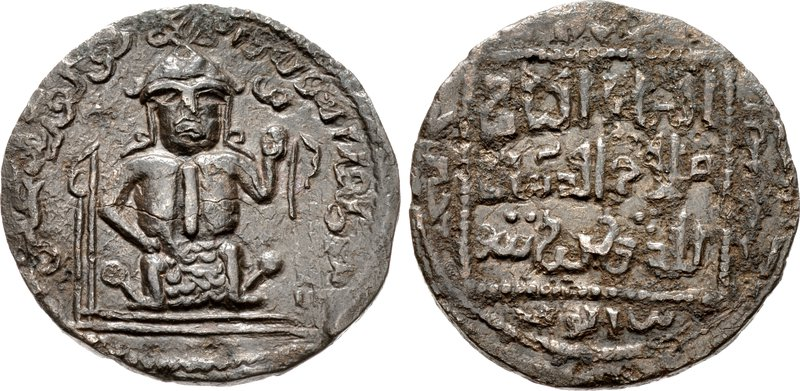
Coinage of Muzaffar al-Din Gökböri. Unlisted (Irbil) mint. Struck circa 1187-1191 CE. Obverse: Enthroned figure facing, holding globe; name and titles of Muzaffar al-Din Gökböri around. Reverse: Name and title of Ayyubid overlord in three lines within pelleted square; continuation of name and title in outer margins.

Following the Zengid defeat at Hama, and the continuing lack any unifying figure in the mould of Nur ad-Din, Gökböri realised that Zengid power was on the wane in Syria and the Jazira and he made the momentous decision to defect to Saladin in 1182. Saladin had been repulsed from Beirut and was marching on Aleppo when Gökböri visited him with an invitation to cross the Euphrates into the Jazira, where he was assured he would be welcomed. His support for Saladin was instrumental in the defeat of Zengid power in the region; soon little more than the cities of Mosul and Aleppo remained under Zengid control.

In 1185 Saladin was campaigning against Izz ad-Din Mas'ud, the Zengid ruler of Mosul. At this time Gökböri came under suspicion of collusion with Izz ad-DIn. Gökböri had promised the sultan a large sum of money towards the cost of the campaign, but was unable to produce it. Saladin had Gökböri arrested, but quickly released him. Saladin became gravely ill during this campaign, but was nursed back to health in Gökböri's castle at Harran. In 1186 the war ended, when Izz ad-Din Mas'ud agreed to become Saladin's vassal.

Following the conquest of Northern Syria and the Jazira, Saladin added Edessa (Urfa) and Samsat to Gökböri's lands. He was then given Saladin's sister, al-Sitt Rabia Khatun, in marriage.

== War against the Crusader states ==
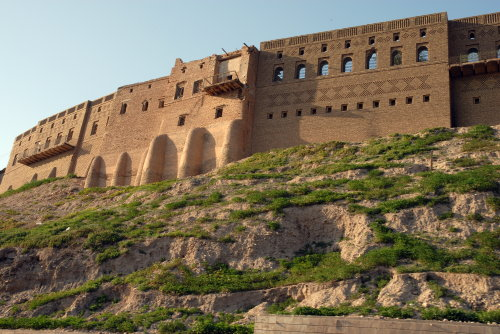
Citadel of Erbil, Iraqi Kurdistan

Gökböri became known as a reliable and skilled military leader. Saladin's secretary, the historian Imad ad-Din al-Isfahani, described him as: "... the audacious, the hero of well thought out projects, the lion who heads straight for the target, the most reliable and firmest chief."

In Saladin's campaigns against the Crusader states Gökböri was given important commands. At the Battle of Cresson (1187) he led an army of 700–7,000 which defeated a Christian army containing a large contingent from the military orders. The Christian army was destroyed and the master of the Knights Hospitaller, Roger de Moulins, was killed. The military exploits of Gökböri were recorded in the contemporary accounts of his Christian enemies, to whom he was known as Manafaradin.

Gökböri's finest military achievement was at the Battle of Hattin in 1187, where he commanded the left of the Ayyubid army. Saladin commanded the centre and his nephew, Taqi ad-Din, the right. This battle saw the destruction of the army of the Kingdom of Jerusalem, leading to the fall of the greater part of the kingdom, including the holy city of Jerusalem, to Saladin. Ibn Khallikan describes how Gökböri and Saladin's nephew stood firm when the rest of the army was fleeing. They rallied the Ayyubid forces and led them in a counter-attack which decided the battle.

In 1190, during the Siege of Acre by the forces of the Third Crusade, Gökböri's brother Zain ad-Din Yusuf died. Gökböri then petitioned Saladin for the return of his paternal inheritance of the city of Erbil. He received Erbil and Shahrozur, but surrendered Edessa, Harran and Samsat, which were granted to Taqi ad-Din. Though the siege was ongoing, Saladin allowed Gökböri to go to Erbil to establish his authority in the city. Taqi ad-Din was summoned to take over the troops previously commanded by Gökböri. Gökböri entered Erbil in January 1191.

== Ruler of Erbil ==
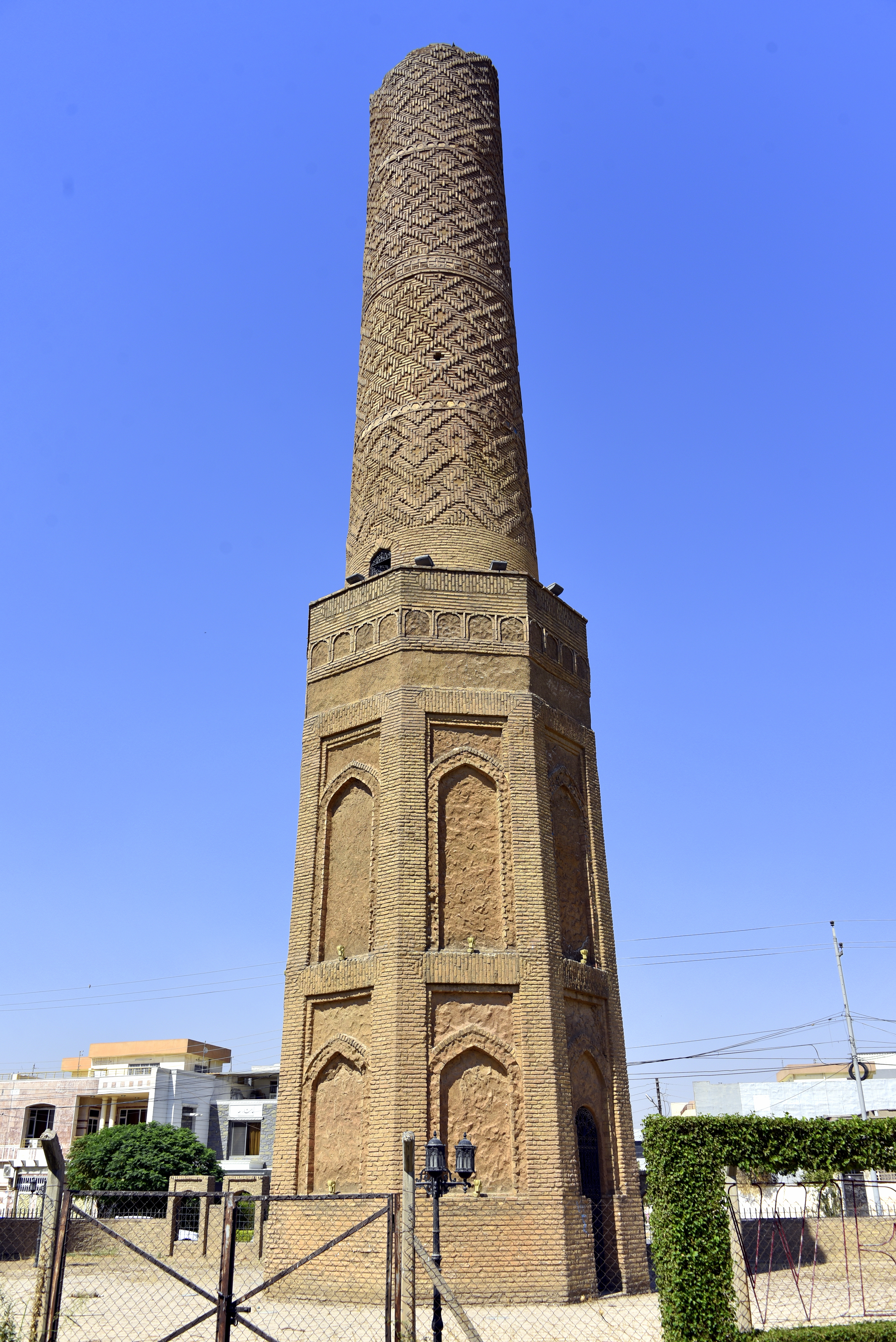
Mudhafaria Minaret, Erbil, built by Gökböri

Gökböri remained the ruler of Erbil until his death. After the death of his patron Saladin, in 1193, he was effectively an independent ruler, acknowledging no superior other than the Caliph. He was a great patron of writers, poets, artists and scholars, whom he invited to Erbil. His administration of Erbil was assisted by the scholar Ibn al-Mustawfi, one of his viziers, who wrote the history of Erbil in four volumes. Gökböri was also a patron of the biographer and historian Ibn Khallikan. He was a devout Sunni Muslim and built extensively in his domains for both the spiritual and corporeal needs of his subjects, creating a religious college, the Dar al-Hadith al-Muzaffariya (founded in 1198), sufi convents (khanqah), a travellers' inn and a number of establishments for the blind, orphans and widows.

He was particularly noted as a fervent celebrator of Mawlid, a ceremonial recitation of praise poems celebrating Muhammad on the anniversary of his birth. Previous to Gökböri, such celebrations consisted of private observances or court processions. Those of Gökböri were held in public, preceded by hunting parties and accompanied by lavish sacrifices. This has been seen by later commentators as representing a level of syncretism with pre-Islamic, traditional, Turkish practices called Siğir and Shölen.

The long reign of Gökböri in Erbil, which became a thriving centre of Sunni learning, was largely due to his highly developed political acumen and judicious choice of alliances. He always made himself more useful as an ally of major powers than attractive as a potential target for their aggression. Though he married into the Ayyubid dynasty, two of his daughters married Zengids. Later in his reign he used alliance with al-Muazzam of Damascus as a counterbalance to the threats of al-Malik al-Ashraf and Badr al-Din Lu'lu'. Badr al-Din Lu'lu' was appointed as atabeg for the successive child-rulers of Mosul, Nur al-Din Arslan Shah II and his younger brother, Nasir al-Din Mahmud. Both rulers were grandsons of Gökböri, and this probably accounts for the animosity between him and Lu'lu'. In 1226 Gökböri, in alliance with al-Muazzam, attacked Mosul, while his ally attacked Homs. As a result of this military pressure, al-Ashraf and Lu'lu' made their submission to al-Muazzam, though al-Muazzam died the following year. Nasir al-Din Mahmud was the last Zengid ruler of Mosul, he disappears from the records soon after Gökböri's death. He was killed by Lu'lu', by strangulation or starvation, and his killer then formally began to rule in Mosul.

== Death ==
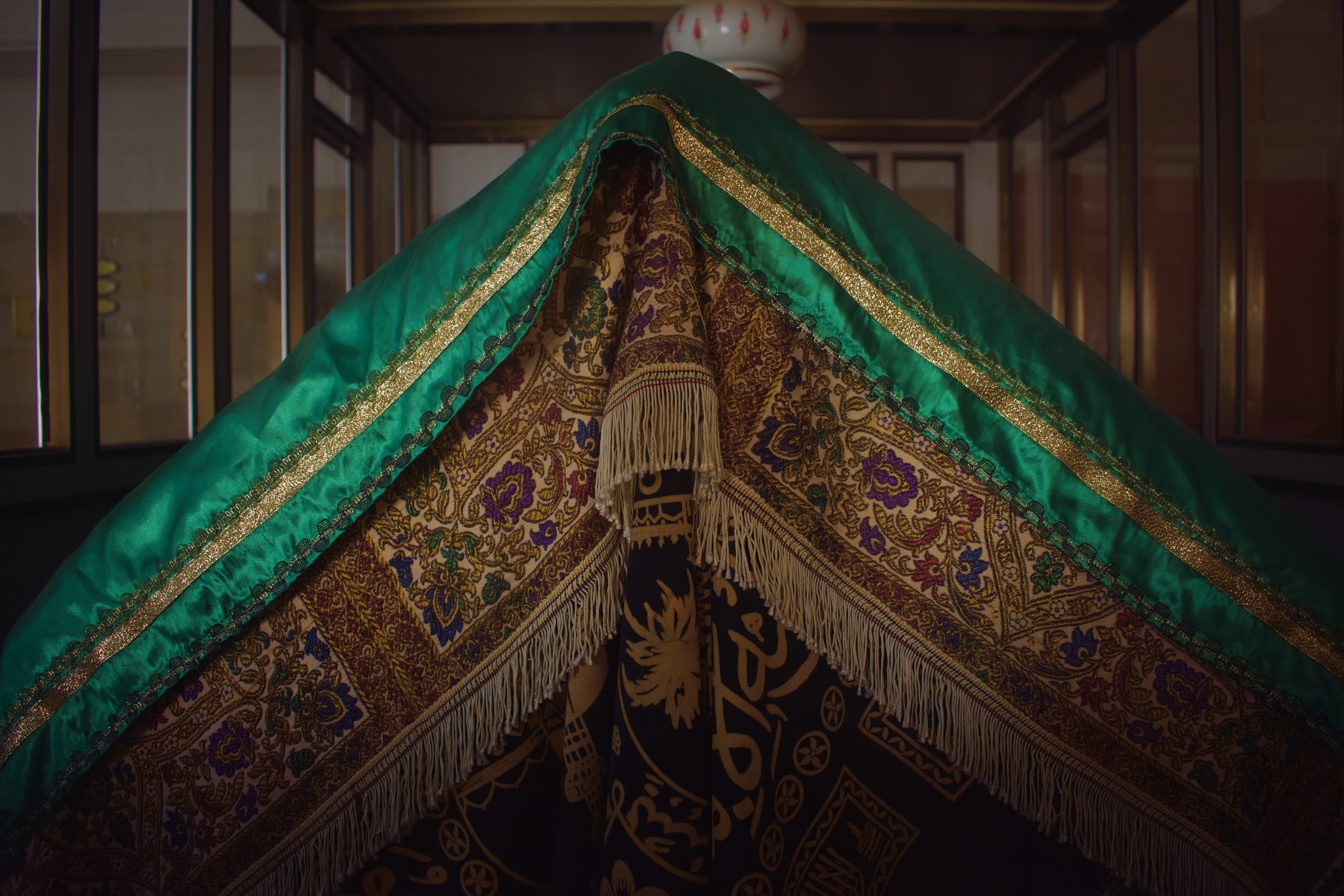
Shrine to Gökböri in Erbil, Iraqi Kurdistan

Being without a male heir, Gökböri willed Erbil to the Abbasid Caliph al-Mustansir.

In old age he campaigned against the Mongols, during their first approaches to Mesopotamia, which they were soon to overrun and devastate. Falling ill, he returned to his lands where he died on 28 June 1233. He was buried in Kufa. Three years later, in 1236, the Mongols sacked Erbil, but were unable to take the citadel; in 1258, during the Siege of Baghdad, Erbil fell to the Mongol general Oroktu Noyan.

== Bibliography ==
- Album, S. (1977) Marsden's Numismata Orientalia Illustrata, Attic Books Limited, London, Ontario ISBN 9780915018161. Reprint of a private printing dating from 1823–1825, in London, England, by William Marsden.
- Baha' Ad-Din Yusuf Ibn Shaddad (Beha Ed-Din), trans. C.W. Wilson (1897) Saladin Or What Befell Sultan Yusuf, Palestine Pilgrims' Text Society, London. Reprinted, 2002, Elibron Classics, Adamant Media, Boston ISBN 9781402192463
- Çaǧatay, N. (1968) "The Tradition of Mavlid Recitations in Islam Particularly in Turkey", Studia Islamica, No. 28, Maisonneuve & Larose (Brill, Leiden). doi:10.2307/1595265 JSTOR 1595265
- Ehrenkreutz, A.S. (1972) Saladin, State University of New York Press, Albany NY. ISBN 9780873950954
- Encyclopaedia of Islam, Second Edition First published online: 2012, P. Bearman, Th. Bianquis, C.E. Bosworth, E. van Donzel and W.P. Heinrichs (eds.), Brill, Leiden, Online version: section on the Begteginids First published online: 2012. First print edition (1960–2007): ISBN 9789004161214
- Gibb, H.A.R. (1962) "The Aiyubids", in History of the Crusades, Volume 2: The Later Crusades, 1189-1311, Wolff, R.L. and Hazzard, H.W. (eds.), Ch. XX, pp. 693–714, University of Pennsylvania Press, Philadelphia PA.
- Hazard, H.W (1958) "The Rise of Saladin 1169–1189", in A History of the Crusades, Volume 1 (M.W. Baldwin ed.), University of Pennsylvania Press, Philadelphia PA, pp. 563–589. ISBN 9780299048440
- Howorth, Sir Henry H. (1876) History of the Mongols: From the 9th to the 19th Century, Volume 1, reprinted (2008) Cosimo Inc., New York ISBN 9781605201337
- Ibn Khallikan (1843) Kitab wafayat ala'yan - Ibn Khallikan's Biographical Dictionary, transl. by Guillaume, Baron Mac-Guckin de Slane, Volume 2, Paris.
- Morray D.W. (1994) An Ayyubid Notable and His World: Ibn Al-ʻAdīm and Aleppo as Portrayed in His Biographical Dictionary of People Associated with the City, Brill. Leiden. ISBN 9004099565
- Nicholson, H (trans.) (1997) Chronicle of the Third Crusade: A Translation of the Itinerarium Peregrinorum Et Gesta Regis Ricardi, Ashgate, Farnham. ISBN 0-7546-0581-7
- Nicholson, H and Nicolle, D (2006) God's Warriors: Knights Templar, Saracens and the Battle for Jerusalem, Osprey Publishing, Oxford. ISBN 1846031435
- Nicolle, D. (2001) The Crusades, Osprey Publishing, Oxford. ISBN 978-1841761794
- Nováček, K., Amin, N.A.M. and Melčák, M. (2013) A Medieval City Within Assyrian Walls: The Continuity of the Town of Arbil in Northern Mesopotamia, Iraq, Vol 75, pp. 1–42, British Institute for the Study of Iraq, London. doi:10.1017/S0021088900000401 JSTOR 43307251
- Patton, D. (1988) Ibn al-Sāʿi's Account of the Last of the Zangids, Zeitschrift der Deutschen, Morgenländischen Gesellschaft, Vol. 138, No. 1, pp. 148–158, Harrassowitz Verlag JSTOR 43377738
- Runciman, Steven (1952). A History of the Crusades, Volume II: The Kingdom of Jerusalem and the Frankish East, 1100–1187. Cambridge, United Kingdom: Cambridge University Press. (Reprint 1990, Penguin, London ISBN 9780140137040)
- Stubbs, W. (ed.) (1864) Itinerarium Peregrinorum et Gesta Regis Ricardi (original text in Latin), Longman, Green, Longman, Roberts, and Green, London. Available at Gallica
- Bezer, G.Öğün (2002). "KÖKBÖRİ". TDV Encyclopedia of Islam, Vol. 26 (Ki̇li̇ – Kütahya) (in Turkish). Istanbul: Presidency of Religious Affairs, Centre for Islamic Studies. p. 234-235. ISBN 978-975-389-406-7.
