= Nur al-Din Arslan Shah I =

- Emir of Mosul
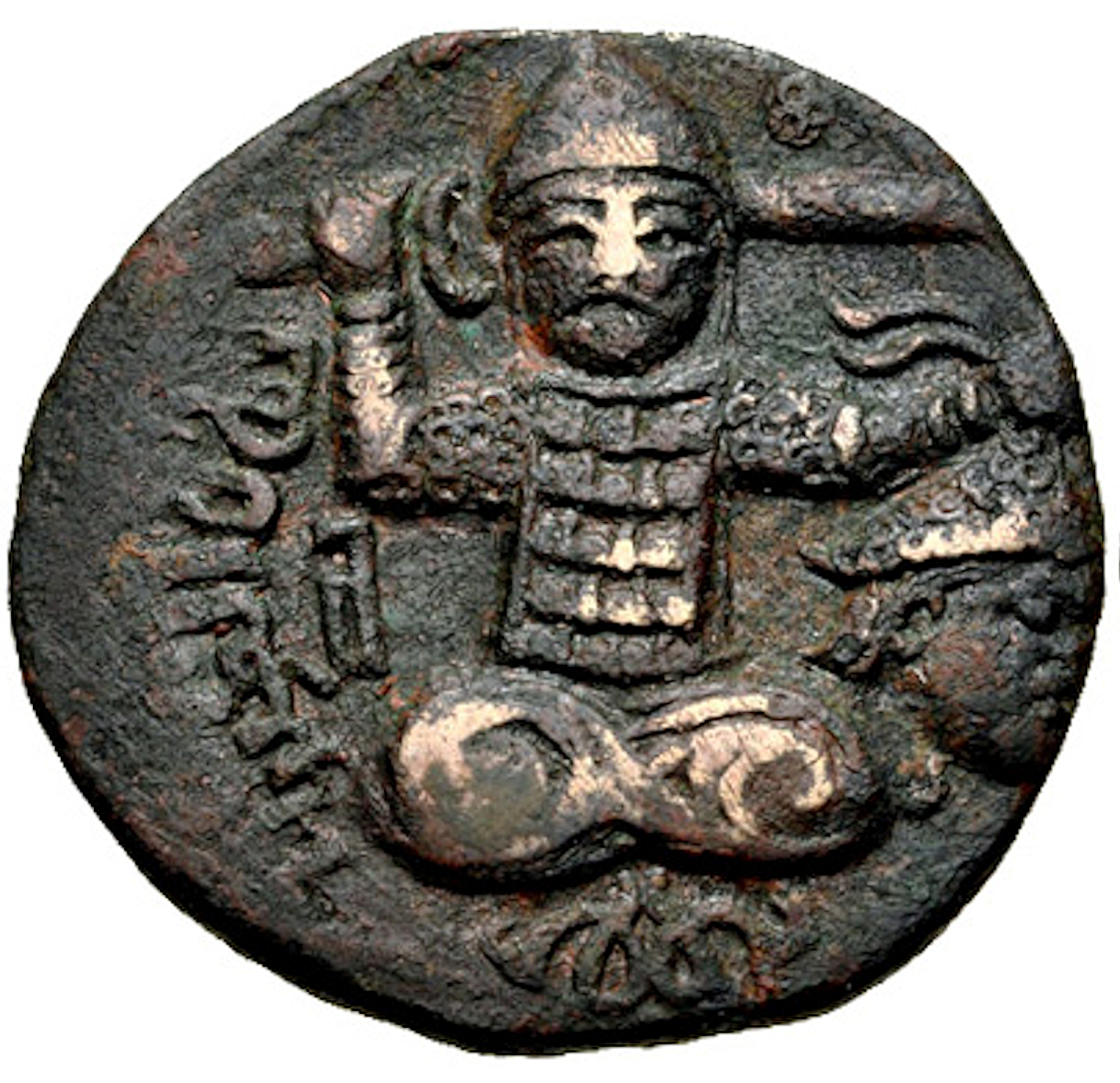
- Turk seated facing with legs crossed, holding sword and crowned severed head, with legend to left "Nur al-Din Atabeg" (نور الدين اتا / بك), probably Nur al-Din Arslan Shah I, on a coin of Husam al-Din Yuluq Arslan, dated AH 596 (1199-1200 CE).
- Reign: 1193-1211
- Predecessor: Izz al-Din Mas'ud
- Successor: Izz al-Din Mas'ud II
- Died: 1211
Names
- Nur al-Din Arslan Shah I ibn Izz al-Din Mas'ud
- House: Zengid Dynasty
- Father: Izz al-Din Mas'ud
- Religion: Sunni Islam

Nur al-Din Arslan Shah I (or Arslan Shah) was the Zengid Emir of Mosul 1193–1211. He was successor of Izz al-Din Mas'ud. He was appointed by the Ayyubids to this position in 1193. One of his slaves was Badr ad-Din Lu'lu', who became a famous ruler of Mosul, and a prominent patron of the arts.

In 1204, Saladin's brother and successor, the Ayyubid ruler Al-Adil I, dispatched an army under the leadership of his own son al-Ashraf of Harran, accompanied by his brother Al-Awhad Ayyub, to relieve the Zengid emir of Sinjar, Qutb ad-Din Muhammad, from an assault by his cousin Nur ad-Din Arslan Shah I, who was the chief Zengid emir. In April 1204 the Ayyubid coalition swiftly defeated Nur ad-Din's forces at Nusaybin, chasing them back to Mosul where they attacked several of the surrounding villages. By September the Ayyubids had established a peace with Nur ad-Din.

In 1209, the Ayyubid ruler Al-Adil I again attempted to annex the Zengid states, and besieged Sinjar. Nur al-Din Arslan Shah I allied with Muzzafar al-Din Kukburi, ruler of Erbil, and resisted the Ayyubid offensive. They reached a truce, according to which al-Adid could retain the lands he conquered in Sinjar (thereafter ruled by the "Ayyubids of Mayyafariqin & Jabal Sinjar", the sons of al-Adid al-Ashraf and Al-Awhad Ayyub), and Arslan Shah would recognize Ayyubid suzerainty on his coinage. As Arslan Shah's health was declining, and his sons were still young, he chose his Commander of the Army Badr al-Din Lu'lu' as protector of his sons and promoted him to atabeg upon his death in 1211. The son and two grandsons of Arslan Shah continued to rule as children in Northern Iraq as Emirs of Mosul and Sinjar until 1234, when Badr al-Din Lu'lu' formally took over, possibly after assassinating the last Zengid Emir of Mosul Nasir ad-Din Mahmud. He ruled in his own name from 1234 until his death in 1259, accepting Mongol suzerainty after 1243.

The manuscript Sirr al-asrār ("Secret of secrets", LJS 459) was decicated in the name of Nur al-Din Arslan Shah I. It is a text purported to be by Aristotle for his pupil Alexander the Great. The cartouche of the frontispiece reads:

The noble king Nur al-Din atabeg Arslan Shah bin Mas'ud bin Mawdud. His victory is our Lord's. Ibn Zangi, may God prolong his reign.

The Sirr al-asrār is said to have been translated from Greek to Arabic by Youhanna (Yahya) ibn al-Batriq at the court of the Abbasid caliph al-Ma'mun in the 9th century, but it may also have been directly written in Arabic. The manuscript contains ten discourses about kingship, government and the military.

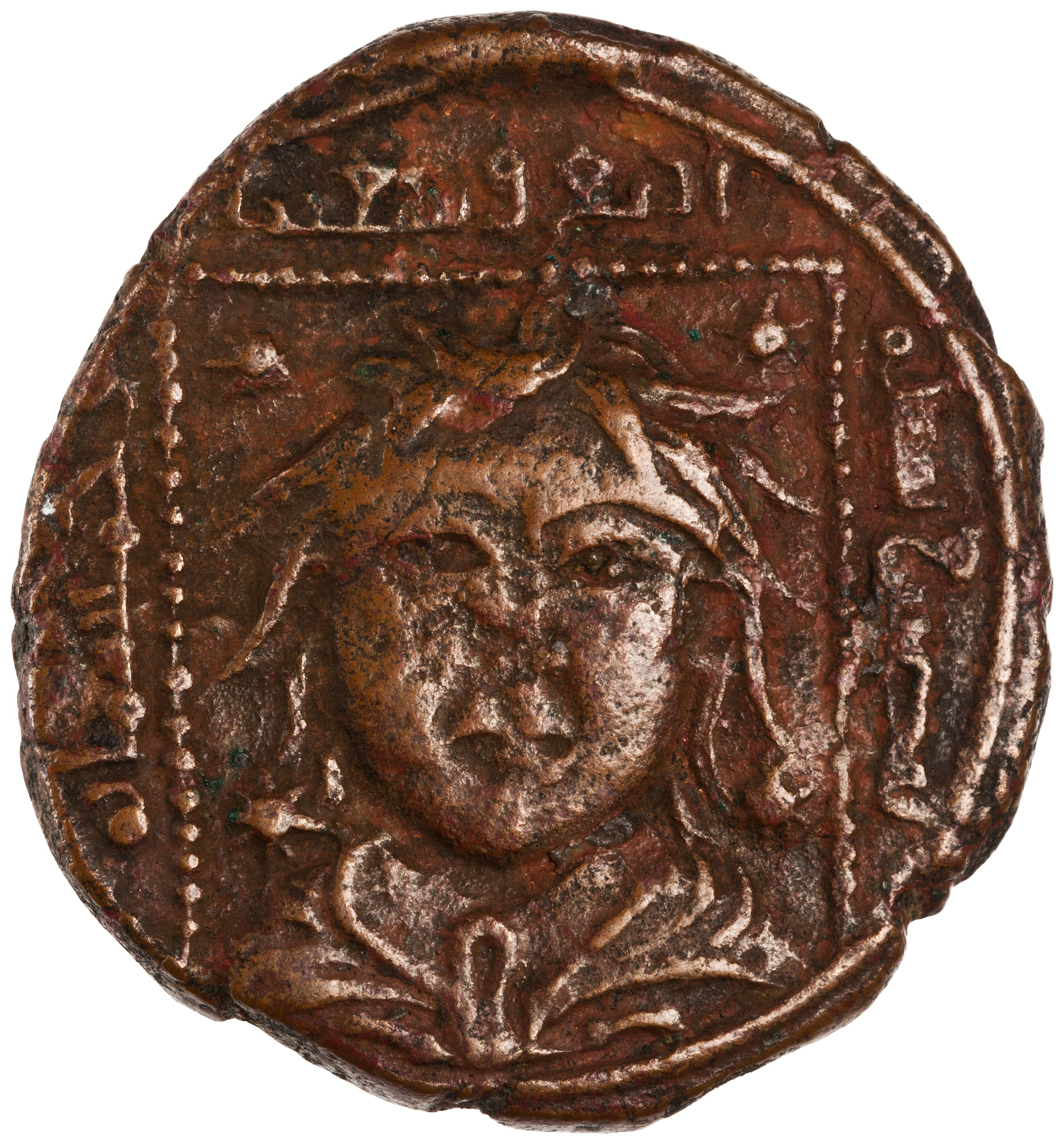
Nur al-Din Arslan Shah I, Nisibin, 594 H (Obverse)

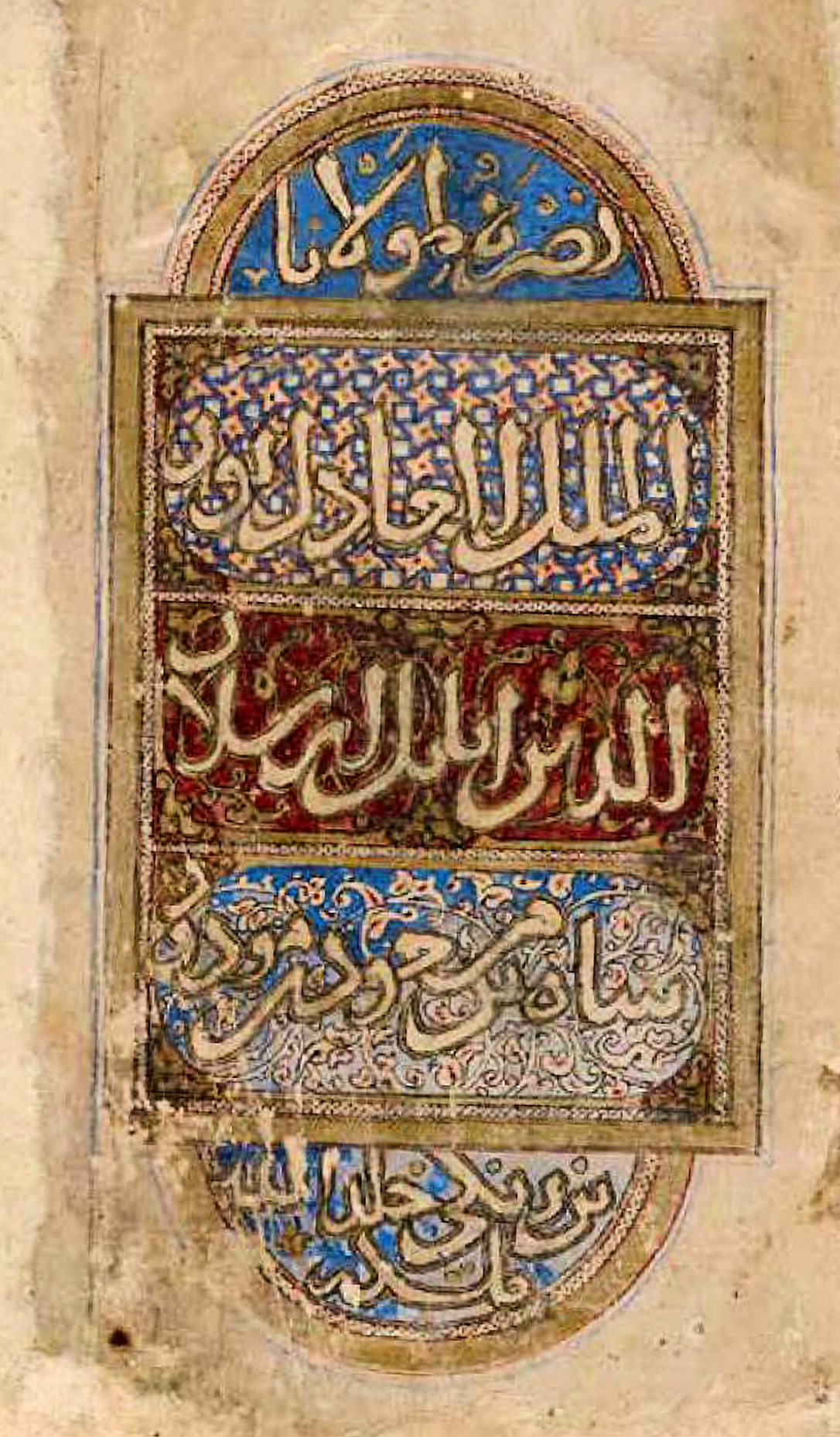
Sirr al-asrār LJS 459. Frontispiece cartouche

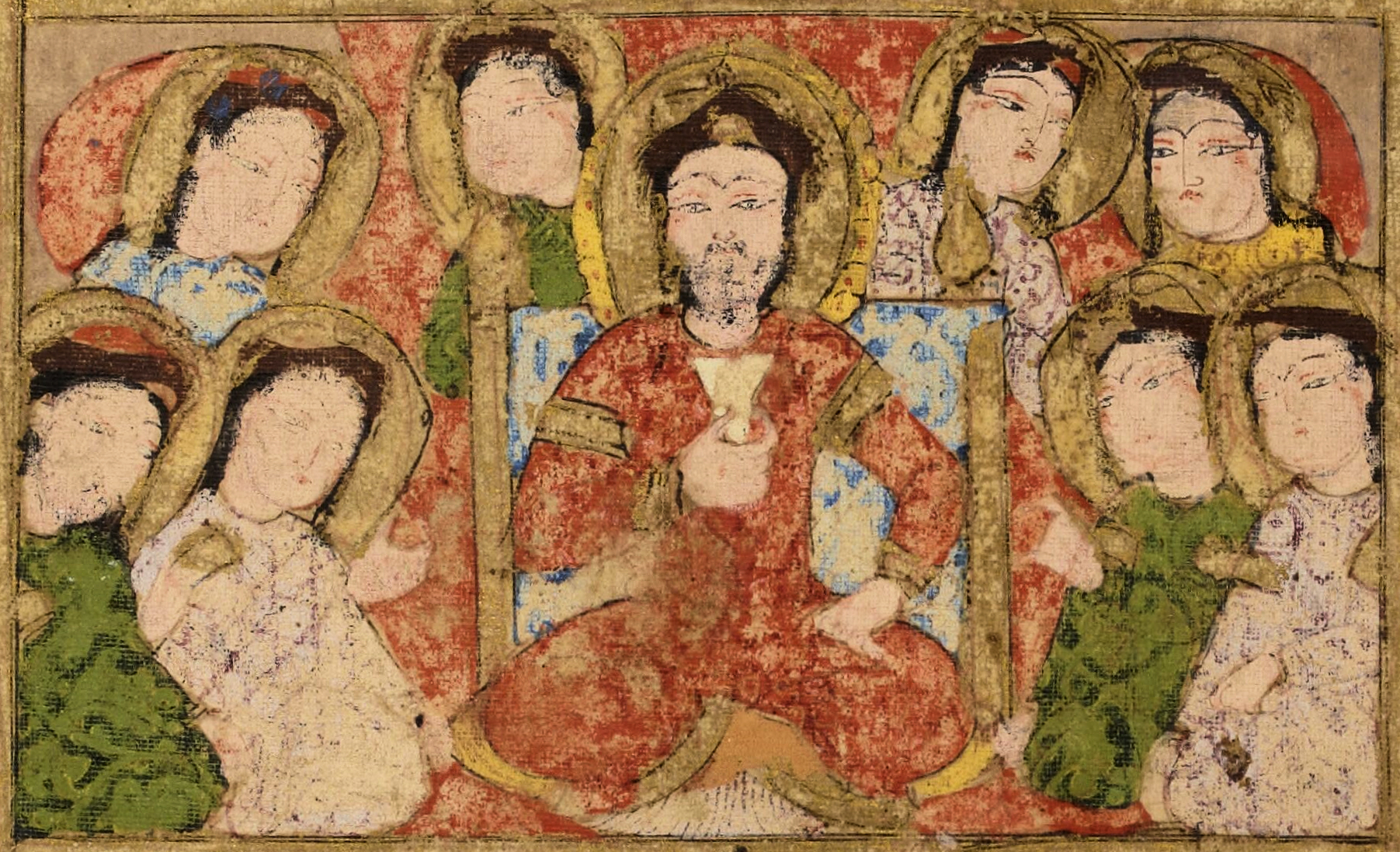
Royal court detail, ruler in Turkic dress, wearing the sharbush hat. 1198–1199, probably Mosul. Kitâb al-Diryâq.

== Sources ==
Canby, Sheila R.; Beyazit, Deniz; Rugiadi, Martina; Peacock, A. C. S. (27 April 2016). Court and Cosmos: The Great Age of the Seljuqs. Metropolitan Museum of Art. p. 60, item 10. ISBN 978-1-58839-589-4.

== See also ==
- Zengid dynasty

Regnal titles
Preceded by Izz al-Din Mas'ud	Emir of Mossul; 1193–1211	Succeeded by Izz al-Din Mas'ud II
