= Izz al-Din Mas'ud II =

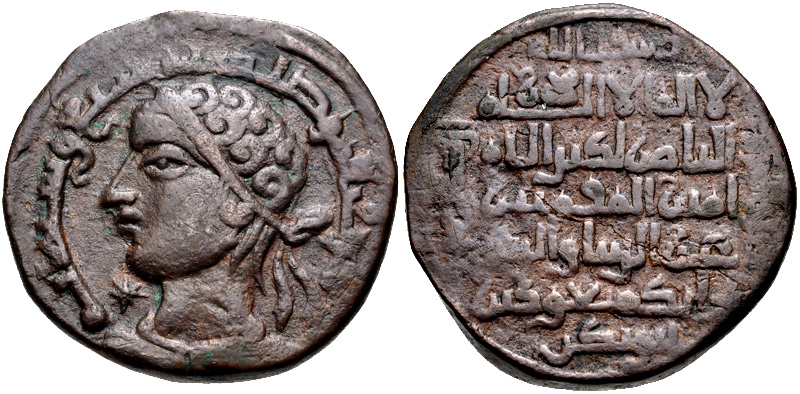
Coinage of Izz al-Din Mas’ud II (reigned 1211–1218 CE). al-Mawsil (Mosul) mint. Dated AH 607 (1211 CE). Obverse: Diademed and draped classical-style male bust left; rudimentary star to left of shoulder; mint name and AH date around. Reverse: Shahada and names and titles of Abbasid Caliph al-Nasir and ‘Izz al-Din Mas’ud in six lines across field; name and title of Ayyubid overlord al-Adil Abu Bakr in external voids.

Izz al-Din Mas'ud II (reigned 1211–1218) was the son and successor of Nur al-Din Arslan Shah I, as Zengid dynasty ruler of the Mosul region in modern Iraq. He was only ten years old when he ascended the throne, and because of that was put under the control of a regent or atabeg by his dying father, in the person of one of his trusted mamluks, Badr al-Dīn Lū'lū'.

Throughout his reign, effective power was held by Badr al-Dīn Lū'lū'.

He had two young sons Nur al-Din Arslan Shah II, and Nasir ad-Din Mahmud, who were also put under the atabegship of Badr al-Din Lu'lu'.

== Sources ==
- Bosworth, C.E. (1996). The New Islamic Dynasties: A Chronological and Genealogical Manual. New York: Columbia University Press.
- Canby, Sheila R.; Beyazit, Deniz; Rugiadi, Martina; Peacock, A. C. S. (27 April 2016). Court and Cosmos: The Great Age of the Seljuqs. Metropolitan Museum of Art. p. 60, item 10. ISBN 978-1-58839-589-4.

== See also ==
- Zengid dynasty

Regnal titles
| Preceded by Nur al-Din Arslan Shah I | Emir of Mossul; 1211–1218 | Succeeded by Nur al-Din Arslan Shah II |
