= List of rulers of Mosul =

This is a list of the rulers of the Iraqi city of Mosul, from the late 7th century until the end of World War I and Ottoman rule.

== Umayyad governors ==
- Muhammad ibn Marwan (ca. 685–705)
- Yusuf ibn Yahya ibn al-Hakam (ca. 685–705)
- Sa'id ibn Abd al-Malik (ca. 685–705)
- Yahya ibn Yahya al-Ghassani (719–720)
- Marwan ibn Muhammad ibn Marwan (720–724)
- Al-Hurr ibn Yusuf (727–731/32)
- Yahya ibn al-Hurr (732/33)
- Al-Walid ibn Talid (733–739)
- Abu Quhafa ibn al-Walid (739–743)
- Al Qatiran ibn Akmad ibn al-Shaybani (744–745)
- Hisham ibn Amr-al Zubayr (745–750)

== Abbasid governors ==
- Muhammad ibn Sawl (750–751)
- Yahya ibn Muhammad ibn Ali (c. 751)
- Ismail ibn Ali ibn Abdullah (751–759)
- Malik ibn al-Haytham al-Khuzai (759–762)
- Ja'far ibn Abu Jafar (762–764)
- Khalid ibn Barmak (764–766)
- Ismail ibn Abd Allah ibn Yazid (768–770)
- Yazid ibn Usayd ibn Zafir al-Sulami (770)
- Musa ibn Ka'b (771–772)
- Khalid ibn Barmak and Musa ibn Mus'ab (772–775)
- Ishaq ibn Sulayman al-Hashimi (776)
- Hassan al Sarawi (776–777)
- Abd al-Samad ibn Ali (778)
- Muhammed ibn al-Fadl (779–780)
- Ahmad ibn Ismail ibn Ali (781–782)
- Musa ibn Mus'ab (782–783)
- Hashim ibn Sa'id (785)
- Abd al-Malik ibn Salih (785–787)
- Ishaq ibn Muhammed (787–778)
- Saíd ibn al-Salm (778–789)
- Abd Allah ibn Malik (789–791)
- al-Hakam ibn Sulayman (791)
- Muhammed ibn al-Abbas al-Hashimi (791–796)
- Yahya ibn Sa'id al-Harazi (796–797)
- Harthama ibn A'yan (798–802), with various deputies
- Nadal ibn Rifa's (804–805)
- Khalid ibn Yazid ibn Hatim (806)
- Ali ibn Sadaqa ibn Dinar (c. 806)
- Muhammed ibn al-Fadl (806–809)
- Ibrahim ibn al-Abbas (809)
- Khalid ibn Yazid (810)
- al-Muttalib ibn Abd Allah (811)
- al-Hasan ibn Umar (812)
- Tahir ibn Husayn (813)
- Ali ibn al-Hasan ibn Sailh (814–817)
- al-Sayyid ibn Anas (817–826)
- Muhammed ibn Humayd al-Tusi (826–827)
- Harun ibn Abu Khalid (827)
- Muhammed ibn al-Sayyid ibn Anas (827–828)
- Malik ibn Tawk (829–831)
- Mansur ibn Bassam (c.834)
- Abd Allah ibn al-Sayyid ibn Anas (c. 838)
- Akaba ibn Muhammad (before 868)
- Hasan ibn Ayyub (before 868)
- Abd Allah ibn Sulayman (c. 868)
- Musawir: Kharijite rebel (868)
- Azugitin (873–874), with deputies
- Khidr bin Ahmad (c. 874)
  - Autonomous:
- Ishaq ibn Kundaj (879–891)
- Muhammad ibn Ishaq ibn Kundaj (891–892)
- Ahmad ibn Isa al-Shaybani (892–893)
- Hamdan ibn Hamdun, rebel Hamdanid (892–895)
- Direct Abbasid control
  - Hasan ibn Ali (c. 895)
  - Abu Muhammad Ali ibn al-Mu'tadid (c. 899–902)

== Hamdanid emirs ==
- Abdallah Abu'l-Hayja ibn Hamdan, 905–913, 914–916 926–929, as Abbasid governor
- Nasir al-Dawla, 929–930 and 935–967
- Sa'id ibn Hamdan, 931–934
- Abu Taghlib, 967–978
- Directly administered as part of the Buyid emirate of Iraq, 978–989
- Abu Tahir Ibrahim and Abu Abdallah al-Husayn, 989–990

== Uqaylid emirs ==
- Muhammad ibn al-Musayyab ca. 990–991/2
- Abu Ja'far al-Hajjaj (Buyid governor) 991/2–996
- Al-Muqallad ibn al-Musayyab 996–1001
- Qirwash ibn al-Muqallad 1001–1050
- Baraka ibn al-Muqallad 1050–1052
- Quraysh ibn Baraka 1052–1061
- Under Seljuk suzerainty 1055–1096
- Muslim ibn Quraysh 1061–1085
- Ibrahim ibn Quraysh 1085–1089/90
- Fakhr al-Dawla ibn Jahir (vizier of Malik-Shah I) 1089/90–1092
- Ali ibn Muslim 1092
- Ibrahim ibn Quraysh 1092–1093
- Ali ibn Muslim 1093–1096

== Seljuk governors ==
- Abu Said Kerbogha, 1096–1102.
- Sunqurjah, an officer of Kerbogha and his heir, 1102.
- Musa al-Turkomani, Kerbogha's deputy at Hasankeyf, 1102.
- Shams al-Dawla Jikirmish, 1102–1106.
- Zengi ibn Jikirmish, 1106-1107.
- Malik Shah of Rum, during his short reign, Mosul was under the Seljuks of Rum, 1107.
- Jawali Saqawa, 1107–1108.
- Mawdud, 1109–1113.
- Aqsunqur al-Bursuqi, 1113–1114.
- Juyûsh-Beg, 1114–1124
- Aqsunqur al-Bursuqi, second rule, 1124–1126
- Mas’ûd ibn Bursuqî, son of Aqsunqur al-Bursuqi, 1126–1127.

== Zengid emirs ==
- [Under Seljuk sovereignty]
- Imad al-Din Zengi 1127–1146
- Saif ad-Din Ghazi I 1146–1149
- Qutb ad-Din Mawdud 1149–1169
- Ghazi II Saif ud-Din 1169–1180
- Mas'ud I 'Izz ud-Din 1180–1193 and:
- Sanjar Shah (at Jazira) 1176–1208 and:
- Arslan I Shah Nur ud-Din 1193–1211 and:
- Mahmud Muizz ad-Din (at Jazira) 1208–1241 and:
- Mas'ud II 'Izz ud-Din 1211–1218 and afterwards:
- Arslan II Shah Nur ud-Din 1218–1219 and afterwards:
- Nasir ad-Din Mahmud 1219–1234.

== Lu'lu'id emirs ==
- Badr al-Din Lu'lu', former atabeg to Nasir ad-Din Mahmud, 1234–1259
- [Under Mongols suzerainty beginning in 1254]
- As-Salih Isma'il, son of Badr al-Din Lu'lu', in Mosul and Sinjar, 1259–1262
- Al-Muzaffar 'Ala' al-Din 'Ali, son of Badr al-Din Lu'lu', in Sinjar, 1259
- Sayf al-Din Ishāq, son of Badr al-Din Lu'lu', in Jazirat ibn 'Umar, 1259-1262.

== Mongol Governors ==
- Mulay Noyan c. 1296–1312
- Amīr Sūtāy 1312–1331/1332, Sutayid
- Alī Pādshāh, Oirat 1332–1336
- Ḥājī Ṭaghāy ibn Sūtāy 1336–c. 1342, Sutayid
- Ibrahim Shah 1342–1347, Sutayid, nephew of Ḥājī Ṭaghāy
- To the house of Jalayirid of Baghdad 1340s–1383

== Jalayirid ==
- Bayazid 1382–1383
- To the Horde of the Black Sheep 1383–1401
- To the Timurid Empire 1401–1405
- To the Horde of the Black Sheep 1405–1468
- To the Horde of the White Sheep 1468–1508
- To Persia 1508–1534
- To the Ottoman Empire 1534–1623
- To Persia 1623–1638
- To the Ottoman Empire 1638–1917

== Ottoman governors ==
- Ezidi Mirza (1649-1650)
- Hatibzade Yahya Pasha (1748)
- Hüseyin Pasha 1758–?
- Murad Pasha ?
- Sa'dullah Pasha ?
- Hasan Pasha of Mosul ?
- Mehmed Pasha of Mosul ?
- Süleyman Pasha ?
- Mehmed Amin Pasha ?
- Mahmud Pasha ?
- Abdurrahman Pasha ?
- Ahmed Pasha ?
- Osman Pasha ?
- Naman Pasha ?–1831
- Omari Pasha 1831–1833
- Yahya Pasha 1833–1834
- Injal Pasha 1835–1840
- ? 1840–1844
- Sherif Pasha 1844–1845
- Tayyar Pasha 1846
- Esad Pasha 1847
- Vechihi Pasha 1848
- Kâmil Pasha 1848–1855
- Within the eyalet of Van 1855–1865
- Within the vilayet of Iraq 1865–1875
- ? 1875–1889
- Kürd Reshid Pasha 1889
- ? 1889–1894
- Aziz Pasha 1894–1895
- Kölemen Abdullah Pasha 1896
- Zihdi Bey 1897
- Abdülwahib Pasha 1898
- Hüseyin Hazim Pasha 1898–1900
- Hadji Reshid Pasha 1901
- Nuri Pasha 1902–1904
- Mustafa Bey 1905–1908
- Fazil Pasha 1909
- Tahir Pasha 1910–1912
- Süleyman Nasif Bey 1913–1916
- Haydar Bey 1916–1918

== Sources ==
- Grousset, René (1934). History of the Crusades and the Frankish Kingdom of Jerusalem. Paris: Perrin.
- Maalouf, Amin (1983). The Crusades seen by the Arabs. ISBN 978-2-290-11916-7.
