= Badr al-Din Lu'lu' =

13th-century Ruler of Mosul

Badr al-Din Lu'lu' بَدْر الدِّين لُؤْلُؤ
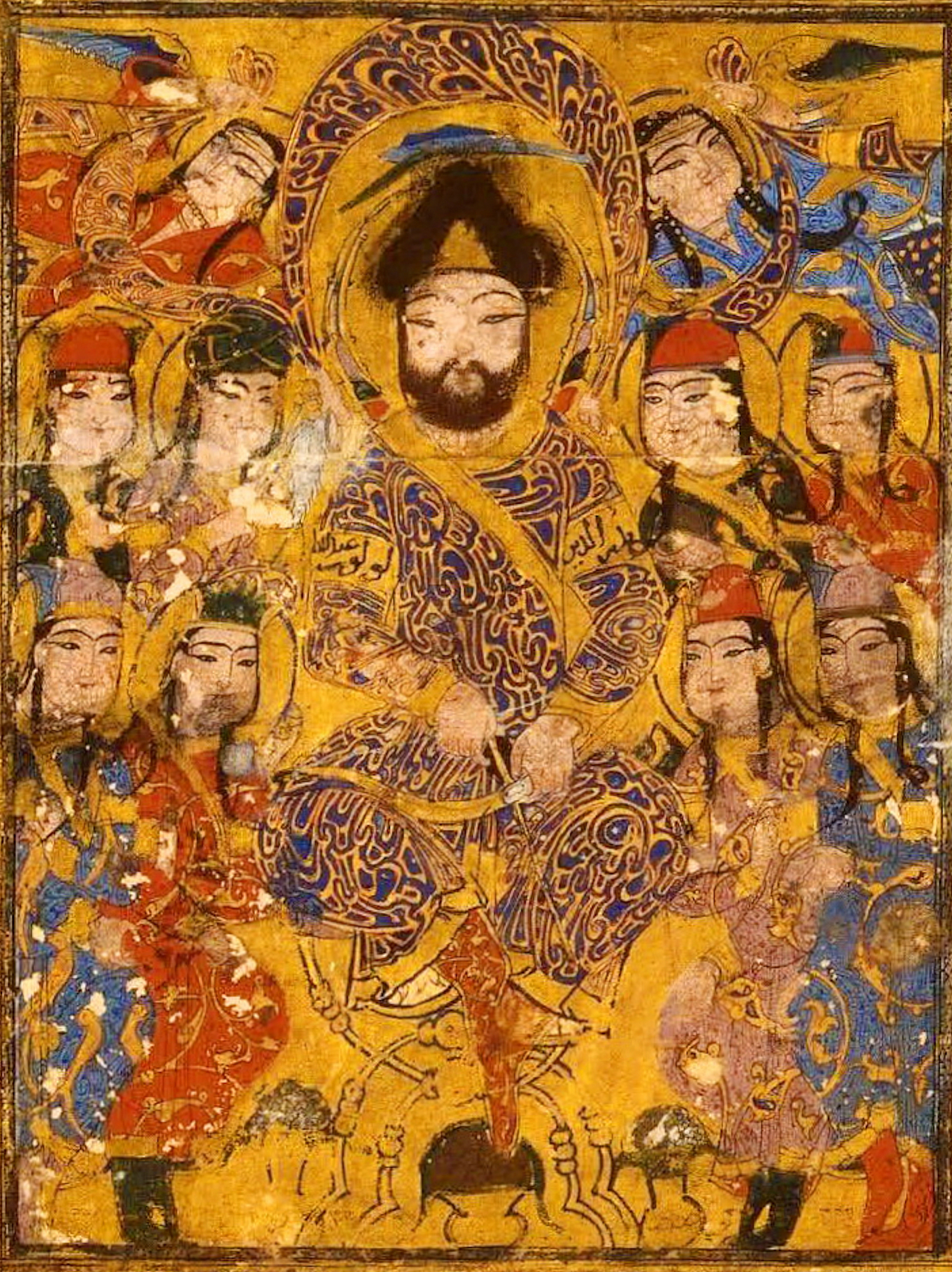
- Probable portrait of Badr al-Din Lu'lu'. Manuscript illustration from the Kitāb al-Aghānī of Abu al-Faraj al-Isfahani (Feyzullah Library No. 1566, Istanbul). He is wearing a Turkic dress, and is identified by his name "Badr al-Din Lu'lu'" on the țirāz bands. Most of the attendants wear the kallawtah headgear.

Zengid dynasty Governor of Mosul
- Atabeg: 1211–1234

Emir of Mosul
- Rule: 1234–1259
- Predecessor: Nasir ad-Din Mahmud
- Successor: Al-Salih Isma'il ibn Lu'lu'
- Born: c. 1178
- Died: 1259 (aged 81)
Names
- Badr al-Din Lu'lu al-Malik al-Rahim
- Religion: Sunni Islam

Badr al-Din Lu'lu' (Arabic: بَدْر الدِّين لُؤْلُؤ) (c. 1178–1259) (the name Lu'Lu' means 'The Pearl', indicative of his servile origins) was successor to the Zengid emirs of Mosul, where he governed in variety of capacities from 1234 to 1259 following the death of Nasir ad-Din Mahmud. He was the founder of the short-lived Luluid dynasty. Originally a slave of the Zengid ruler Nur al-Din Arslan Shah I, he was the first Middle-Eastern mamluk to transcend servitude and become an emir in his own right, founding the dynasty of the Lu'lu'id emirs (1234–1262), and anticipating the rise of the Bahri Mamluks of the Mamluk Sultanate of Egypt by twenty years (but postdating the rise of the Mamluk dynasty in India). He preserved control of al-Jazira through a series of tactical submissions to larger neighboring powers, at various times recognizing Ayyubid, Rûmi Seljuq, and Mongol overlords. His surrender to the Mongols after 1243 temporarily spared Mosul the destruction experienced by other settlements in Mesopotamia.

== Rise to power as Zengid governor of Mosul (1211–1234) ==
Lu'lu' was a freed slave, either of Armenian or Kurdish origin, who served the household of the Zengid ruler Nur al-Din Arslan Shah I. Recognized for his abilities as an administrator, he rose to the rank of atabeg and, after 1211, was appointed as atabeg for the successive child-rulers of Mosul, Nur al-Din Arslan Shah II and his younger brother, Nasir al-Din Mahmud. Both rulers were grandsons of Gökböri, Emir of Erbil, and this probably accounts for the animosity between him and Lu'lu'. In 1226 Gökböri, in alliance with al-Muazzam of Damascus, attacked Mosul. As a result of this military pressure, Lu'lu' was forced to make a submission to al-Muazzam. Nasir al-Din Mahmud was the last Zengid ruler of Mosul, he disappears from the records soon after Gökböri's death. He was killed by Lu'lu', by strangulation or starvation, and his killer then formally began to rule in Mosul in his own right.

== Emir of Mosul (1234–1259) ==
In 1234 Lu'lu' minted the first coins in his own name, mentioning obedience to the Abbasid Caliph al-Mustansir, and his Ayyubid overlords al-Kamil and al-Ashraf. Following his usurpation his new position as ruler of Mosul was recognised by the Abbasid Khalif, Al-Mustansir, who bestowed upon him the praise name al-Malik al-Rahim ("The Merciful King"). During his reign he sided with successive Ayyubid rulers in his disputes with other local princes. In 1237 Lu'Lu' was defeated in battle by the army of the former Khwarazmshah and his camp was thoroughly looted.

Lu'lu' was in conflict with Yezidi Kurds in his territories, he ordered the execution of one Yezidi leader, Hasan ibn Adi, and 200 of his followers in 1254. The territory controlled by Badr al-Din Lu'lu' was quite extensive and reached it maximum in 1251, including Kurdistan, Sinjar, Jazirat ibn Umar, Nusaybin in the west, and the Khabur district as far as Qarqisiya on the Euphrates to the east.

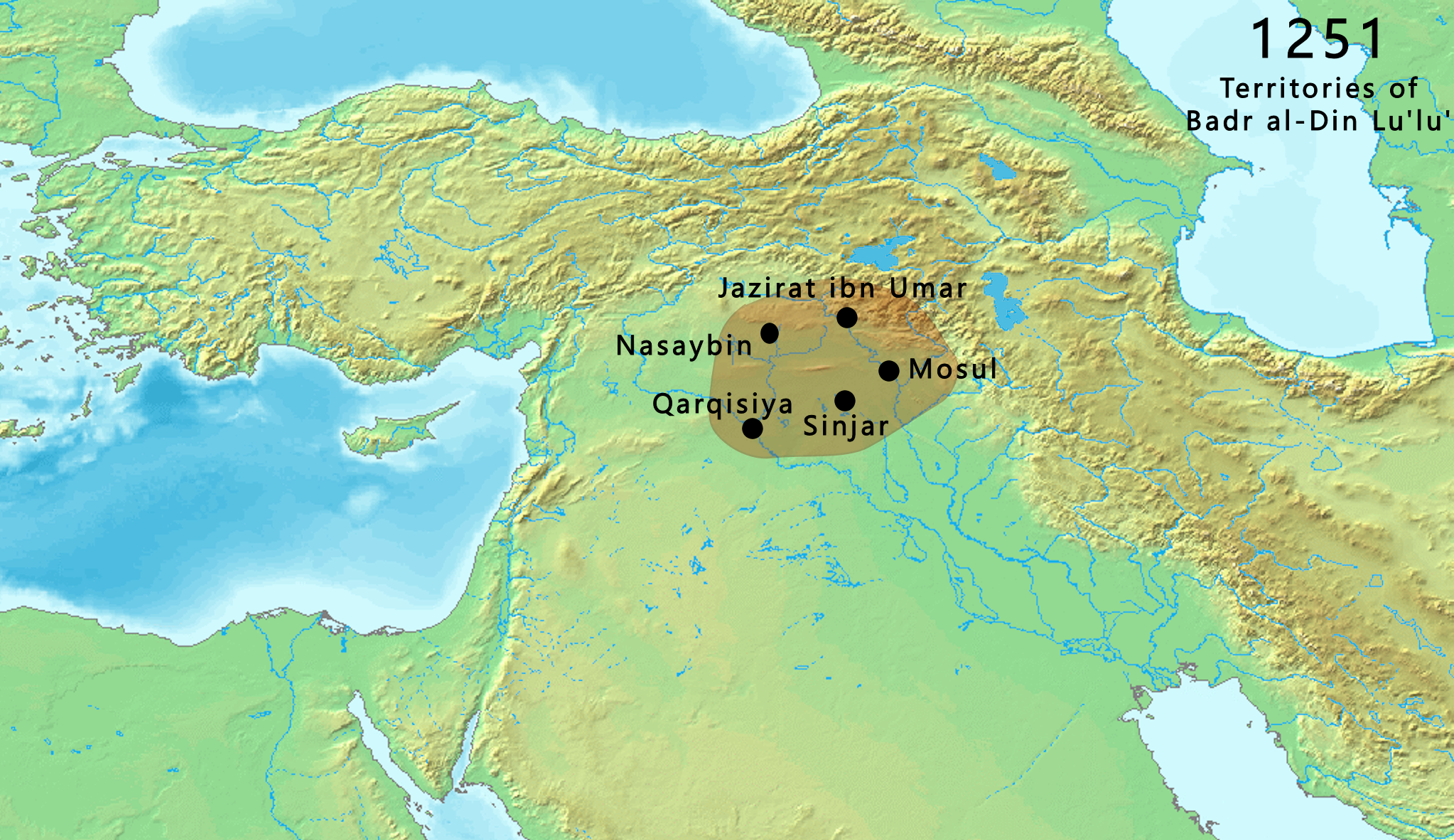
Territories of Badr al-Din Lu'lu' in 1251.

Lu'lu' built extensively in his domain, improving the fortifications of Mosul, the Sinjar Gate bearing his device survived into the 20th century, and constructing religious structures and caravanserais. He built the shrine of Imam Yahya (1239) and the shrine of Awn al-Din (1248). The ruins of his palace complex, known as the Qara Saray (1233–1259), were visible until the 1980s.

The rule of Badr al-Din Lu'lu' seems to correspond to a period of cultural bloom and religious tolerance. He sponsored the arts, including the publication of several illustrated manuscripts. He also seems to have maintained a balance between the Muslim Sunnis and Shiites, providing support for the Shiites in his primarily Muslim Sunni subjects, and seems to have been tolerant of Mosul's large Christian community. This may have been a conscious policy, which provided stability and longevity to his reign.

=== Mongol invasion ===
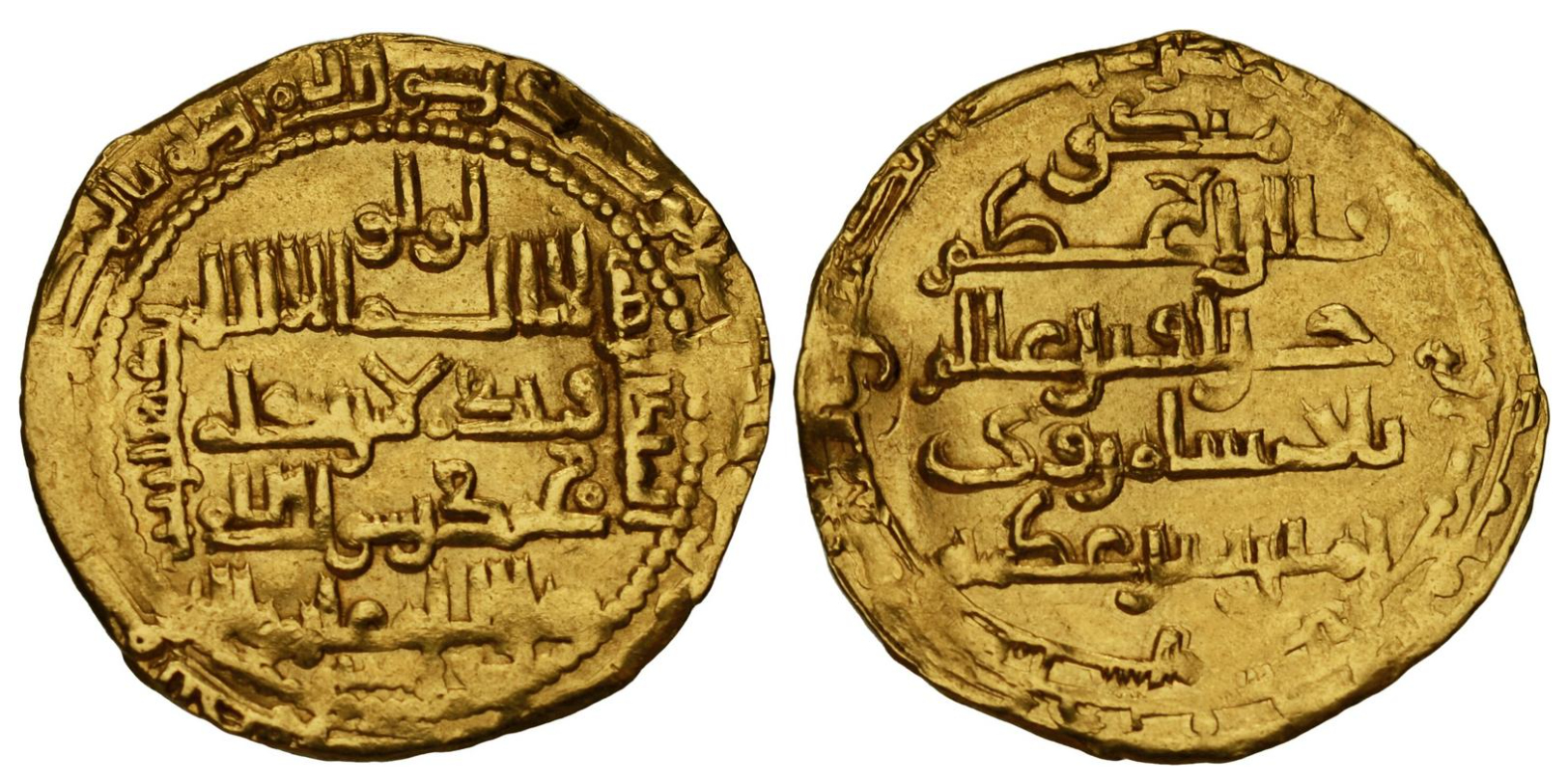
Coinage of Badr al-Din Lu'lu', citing Möngke Khan (above reverse field) as overlord, instead of the Ayyubid ruler al-malik al-nasir. Mosul mint, dated AH 656 (1258).

Badr al-Din Lu'Lu', who also had maintained good relations with the Abbasid Caliph in Baghdad or the Ayyubids of Syria depending on the circumstances, supported the Mongol invasion of Mesopotamia. Following the Battle of Köse Dağ (1243), he recognized the authority of the Mongols in a way similar to the Armenian ruler Hethum I, thus avoiding destruction for his city of Mosul. In 1246, he was summoned to the kuriltai for the accession of the new Mongol ruler Güyük Khan, to which he sent envoys who participated to the ceremonies in Karakorum with other western vassals of the Mongols such as Hethum I of Armenian Cilicia, David VI and David VII of Georgia, the later Seljuk Rums Sultan Kilij Arslan IV, or Manuel I of Trebizond, the Sultan of Erzurum and the Grand Prince of Russia Yaroslav II of Vladimir. Again in 1253, Muslim rulers presented their submission to Möngke in Karakorum, such as the Ayyubid ruler of Mayyafariqin Al-Kamil Muhammad, who went in person and encountered there envoys from Mosul (envoys of Badr al'Din Lu'lu') and Mardin (Artuqids) offering their submission. Badr al'Din Lu'lu' acknowledged Mongol overlordship on his coinage in 1254.

Badr al-Din Lu'lu' brought his assistance to Mongol troops as they converged for the 1258 Siege of Baghdad: Baiju's troops moved south through Mosul, and Badr al-Din Lu'lu' supplied provisions and weapons to the Mongol troops, and built a bridge of boats for their army to cross the Tigris.

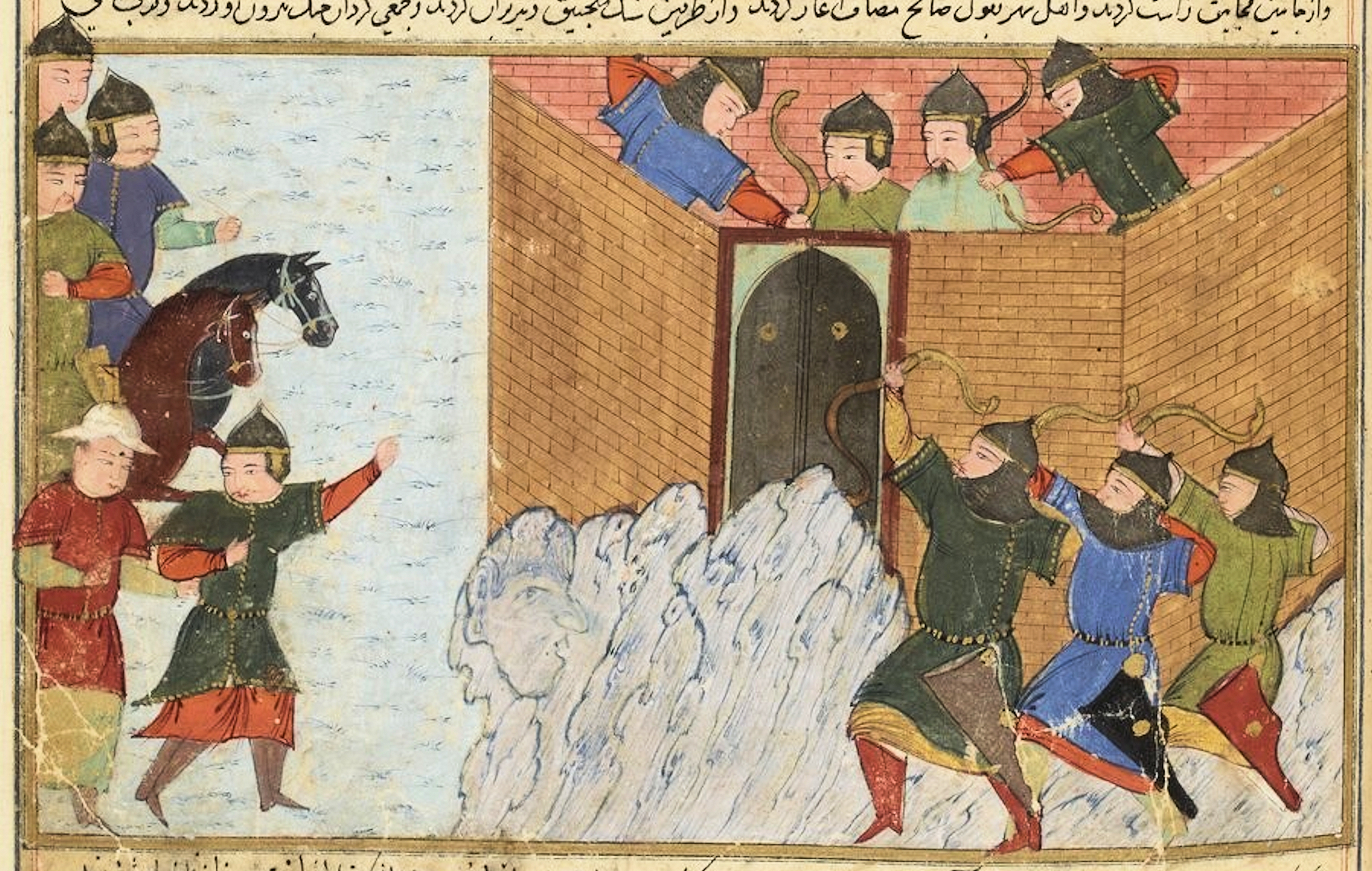
An Ilkhanid miniature depicting the Mongol Siege of Mosul in 1261–1263 from: Rashid-al-Din Hamadani, Jami' al-tawarikh, Bibliothèque Nationale de France (1430).

Badr al-Din helped the Khan in his following campaigns in Syria. During the final stages of the Mongol invasion of Mesopotamia, and following the Siege of Baghdad in 1258, the 80 years old Badr al-Din went in person to Meraga to reaffirm his submission to the Mongol invader Hulagu, together with the Seljuk Rums Sultans Kaykaus II and Kilij Arslan IV, and al-Azziz, son of the Ayyubid ruler of Aleppo an-Nasir Yusuf. For his Syrian campaign, Hulegu asked Badr ad-Dīn Lu'Lu' to send him his son Al-Salih, who was put in charge of the siege of Amid (modern Diyarbakır), while Hulegu campaigned at the head of an army of 120,000 men, including Turkish, Georgian, and Armenian contingents (numbering 12,000 cavalrymen and 40,000 infantrymen for the latter), continuing to Edessa and Antioch.

Mosul was spared destruction, but Badr al-Din died shortly thereafter in 1259. Badr al-Din's son Isma'il ibn Lu'lu' (1259–1262) continued in his father's steps. In 1260, he supported the Mongol troops of Hulagu in the Siege of Mayyāfāriqīn, which was defended by its last Ayyubid ruler Al-Kamil Muhammad.

But after the Mongol defeat in the Battle of Ain Jalut (1260) against the Mamluks, Isma'il sided with the latter and revolted against the Mongols. Hulagu then besieged the city of Mosul for nine months, and utterly destroyed it in 1262.

== Family ==
- Al-Salih Isma'il ibn Lu'lu', the son of Badr al-Din Lu'lu, ruled Mosul for only three years (1259–1262) before his city was lost to the Mongols. Through Mongol intercession, he was married in 1258 to a daughter of the last ruler of the Khwarizmian Empire Jalal al-Din, who had been raised at the Mongol court in Karakorum since her capture in 1231 at the age of two.
- Al-Mujahid Ishaq, son of Badr al-Din Lu'lu, in Jazirat ibn 'Umar, 1259–1262
- Al-Muzaffar 'Alī, son of Badr al-Din Lu'lu, in Sinjar, 1259
- A daughter of Lu'lu' was set to marry Aybak, as his second wife after Shajar al-Durr. However, Aybak was killed before the marriage could take place.

== Contemporary craftsmanship ==
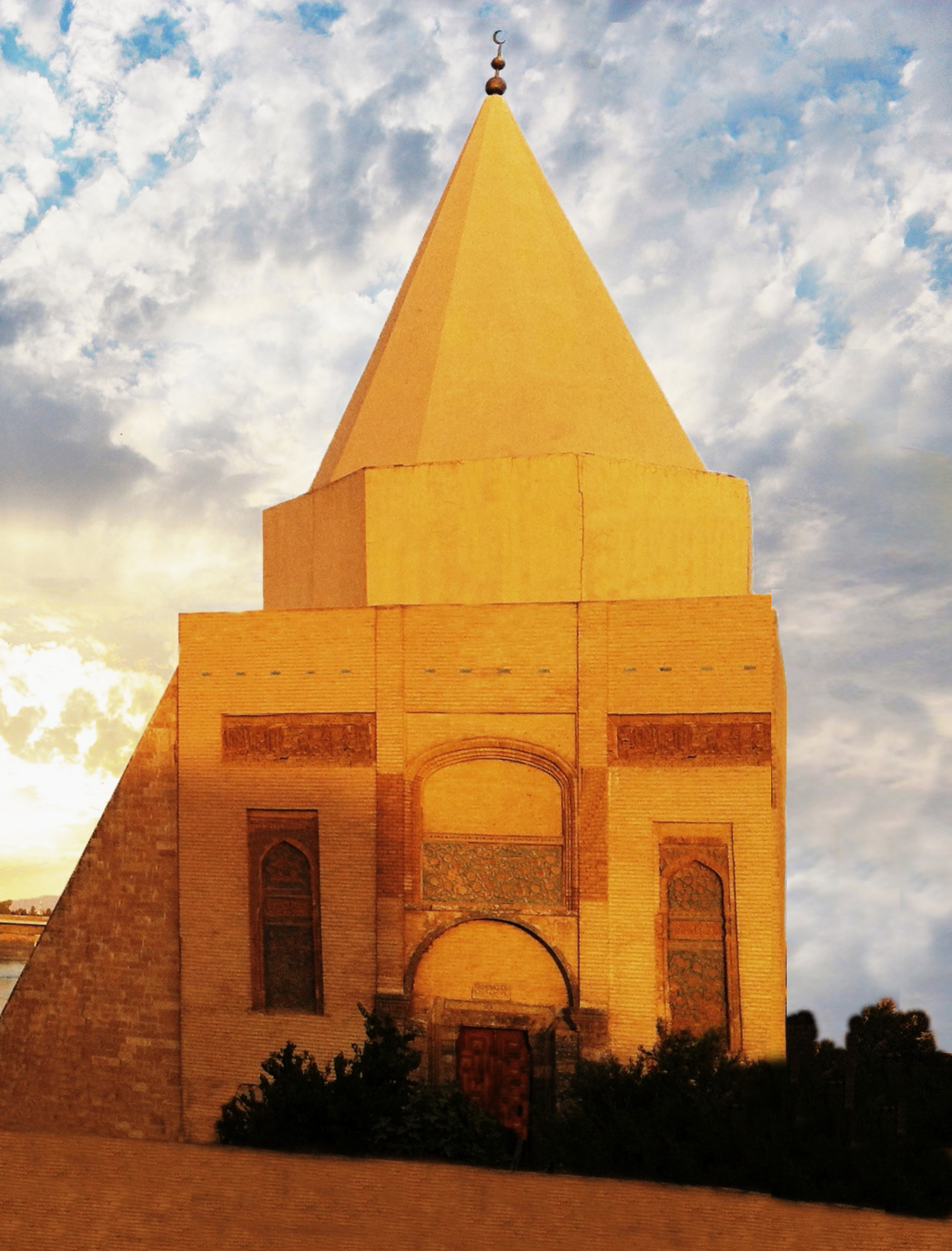
Mausoleum of Yahya Abu al-Qasim, built in Mosul by Lu'Lu' in 1239.

Mosul under Badr al-Din Lu'lu' was characterized by fine crafstmanship, particularly in the areas of woodworking and metalworking, with the production of some of the best inlaid metalworks of the period. Lu'Lu' personally supported the production of inlaid metal ewers, and several examples have remained to this day. The Spanish Muslim traveller Ibn Said reported in 1250:

Mosul … there are many crafts in this city, especially inlaid-brass vessels, which are exported (and presented) to rulers, as are the silken garments woven there

— Ibn Said, 1250.

To a large extent, the flourishing of metalworks under Badr al-Din Lu'lu' and in other parts of the Near-East is attributed to the western exodus of artists from Khurasan as a consequence of the Mongol conquests. Still, some objects are known to date back to as early as 1220, thus essentially predating Mongol invasions, which suggest some production may have pre-existed locally.

The Blacas ewer is generally attributed to Badr al-Din Lu'lu'.

== Literature ==
=== The Book of Songs (1218–1219) ===
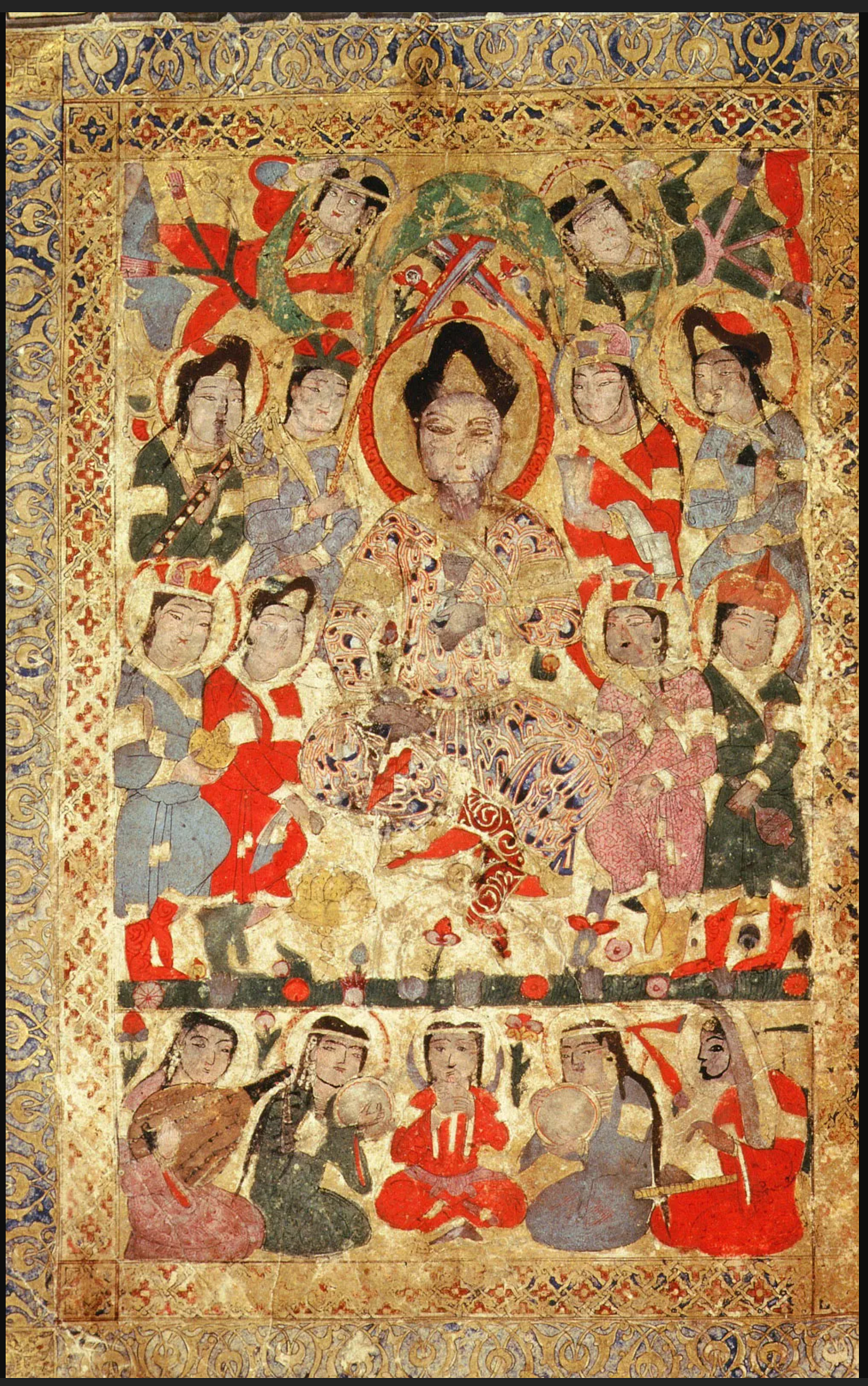
Lu'lu' with musicians and male attendants. Kitāb al-aghānī, Mosul, 1218–1219. Vol IV. Cairo, Egyptian National Library, Ms Farsi 579.

During his period as governor for the Zengid dynasty, Lu'lu' appears prominently in the 1218–1219 edition the Kitāb al-aghānī ("Book of Songs"), probably made in Mosul. The whole edition consists in 20 volumes, four of them now being in the National Library in Cairo (II, IV, XI, XIII), two more in the Feyzullah Library, Istanbul (XVII, XIX), and the last one in the Royal Library, Copenhagen. and had several miniatures, only six of which have remained.

In the miniatures, Lu'lu' wears the Turkic military furred hat, the Sharbush (Harbush). He also wears a gold brocaded Turkic tunic (qabā` turki), with țirāz arm bands on which his name is clearly inscribed. He has red leather boots with stamped gold decorations. Most of his attendants wear the Turkic dress, with Turkic coat, boots and headress.

=== Jacobite-Syrian Lectionary of the Gospels (c.1220) ===
Several important Christian manuscripts were also created in Mosul during the period of the rule Badr al-Din Lu'lu'. One of them, the Jacobite-Syrian Lectionary of the Gospels, was created at the Mar Mattai Monastery 20 kilometers northeast of the city of Mosul, c.1220 (Vatican Library, Ms. Syr. 559). This Gospel, with its depiction of many military figures in armour, is considered as a useful reference of the military technologies of classical Islam during the period.

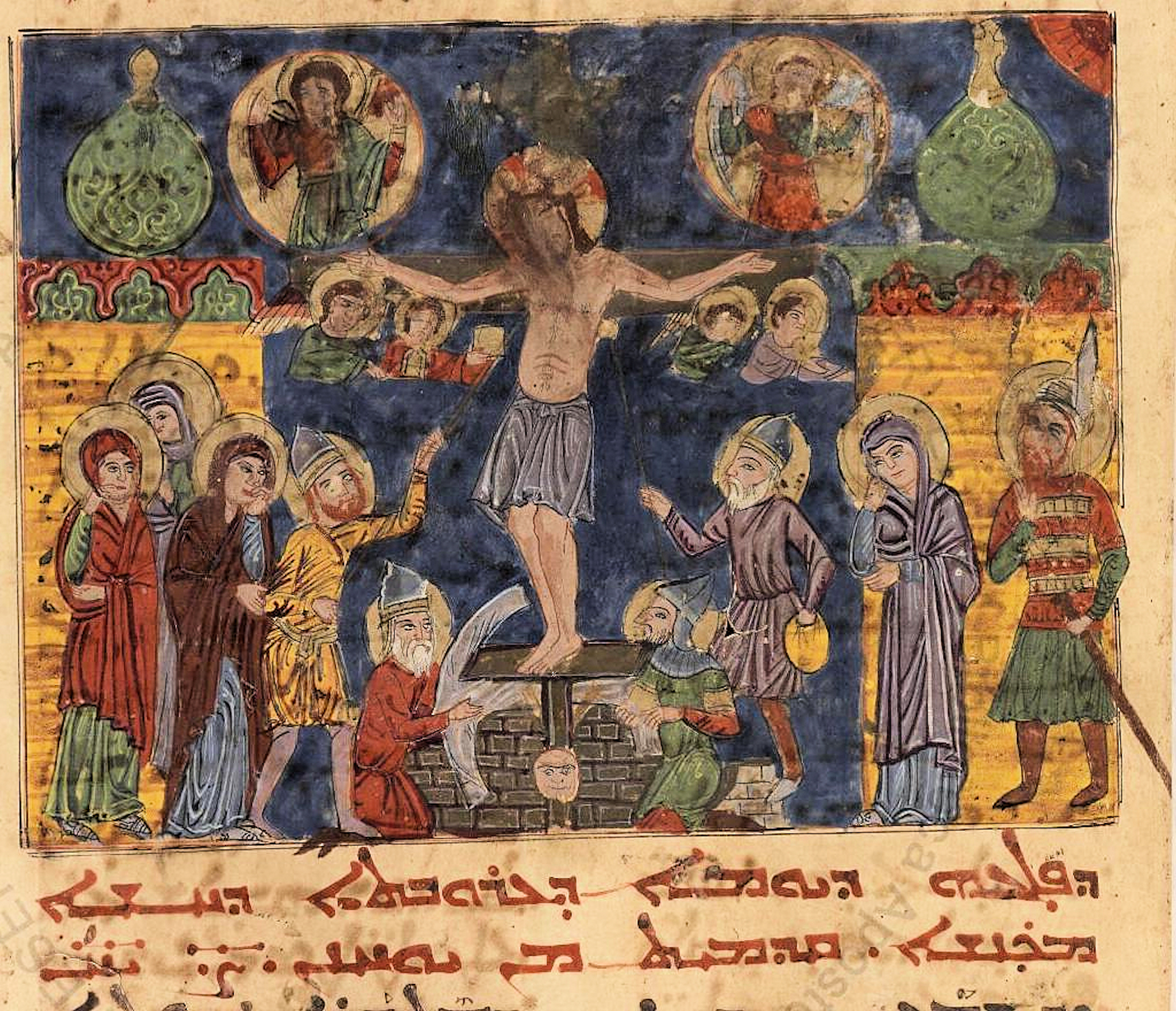
Detail of f.139r, Crucifixion. Vatican Library, Ms. Syr. 559.

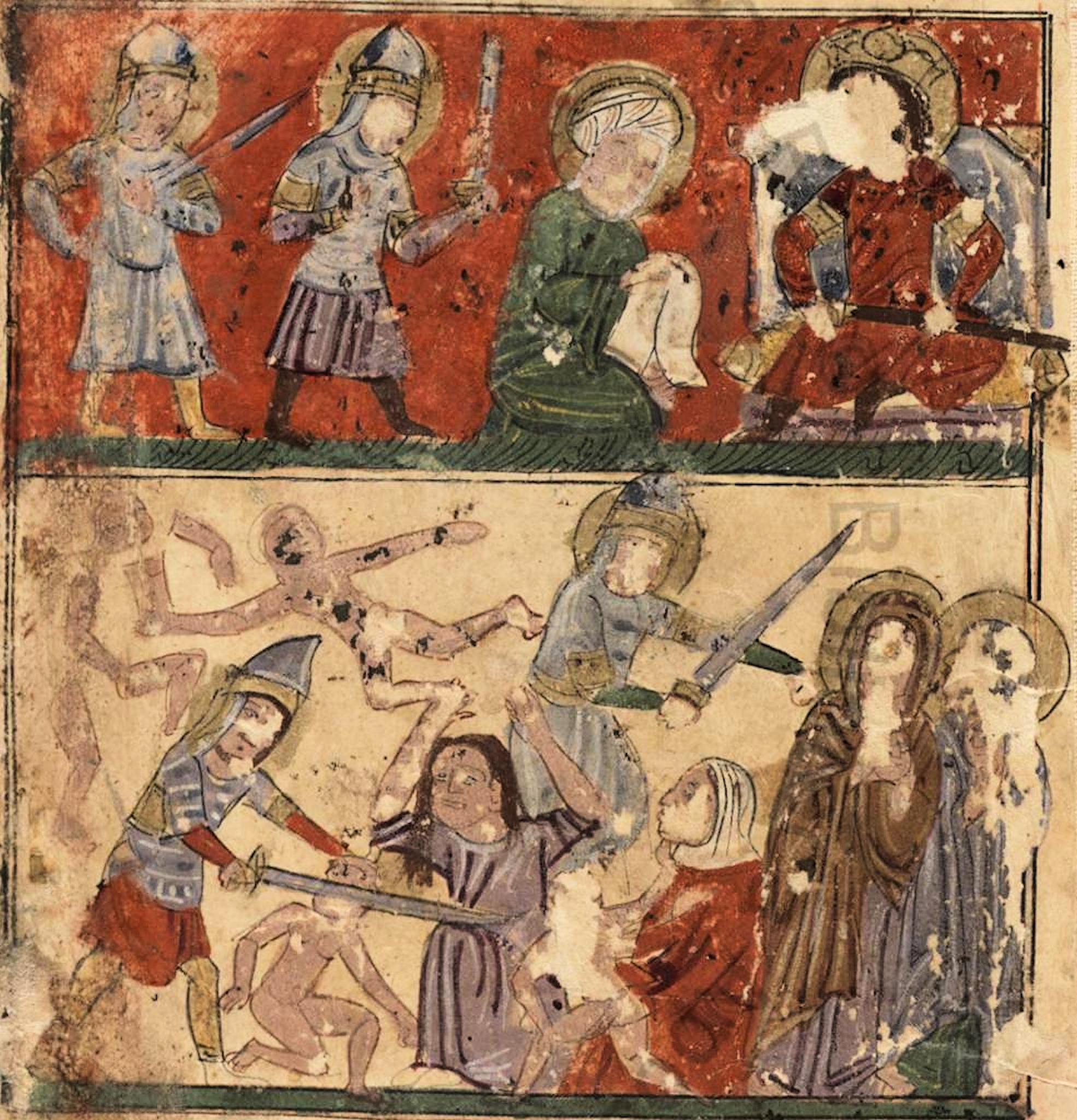
Detail of f.18r, Massacre of the Innocents. Vatican Library, Ms. Syr. 559.

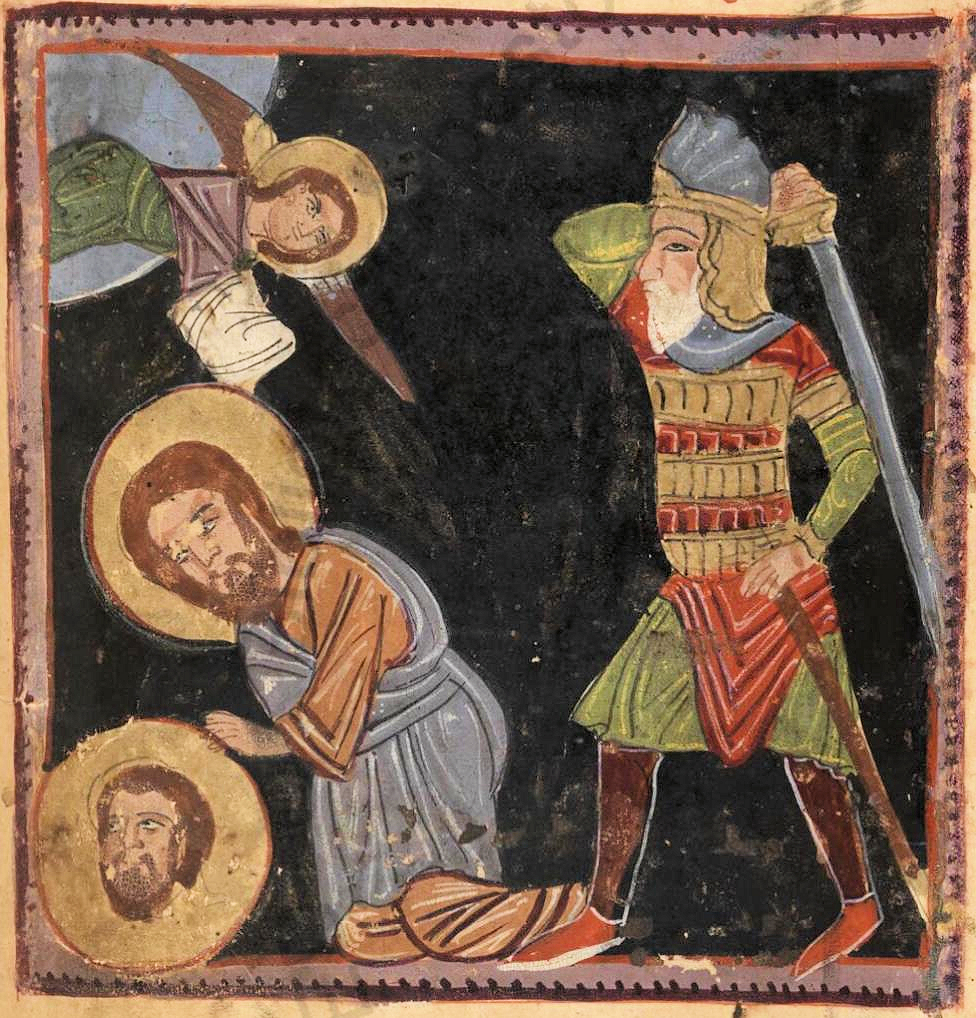
Detail of f.29v, Beheading of John the Baptist. Vatican Library, Ms. Syr. 559.

=== The Book of Theriac (1225–1250) ===
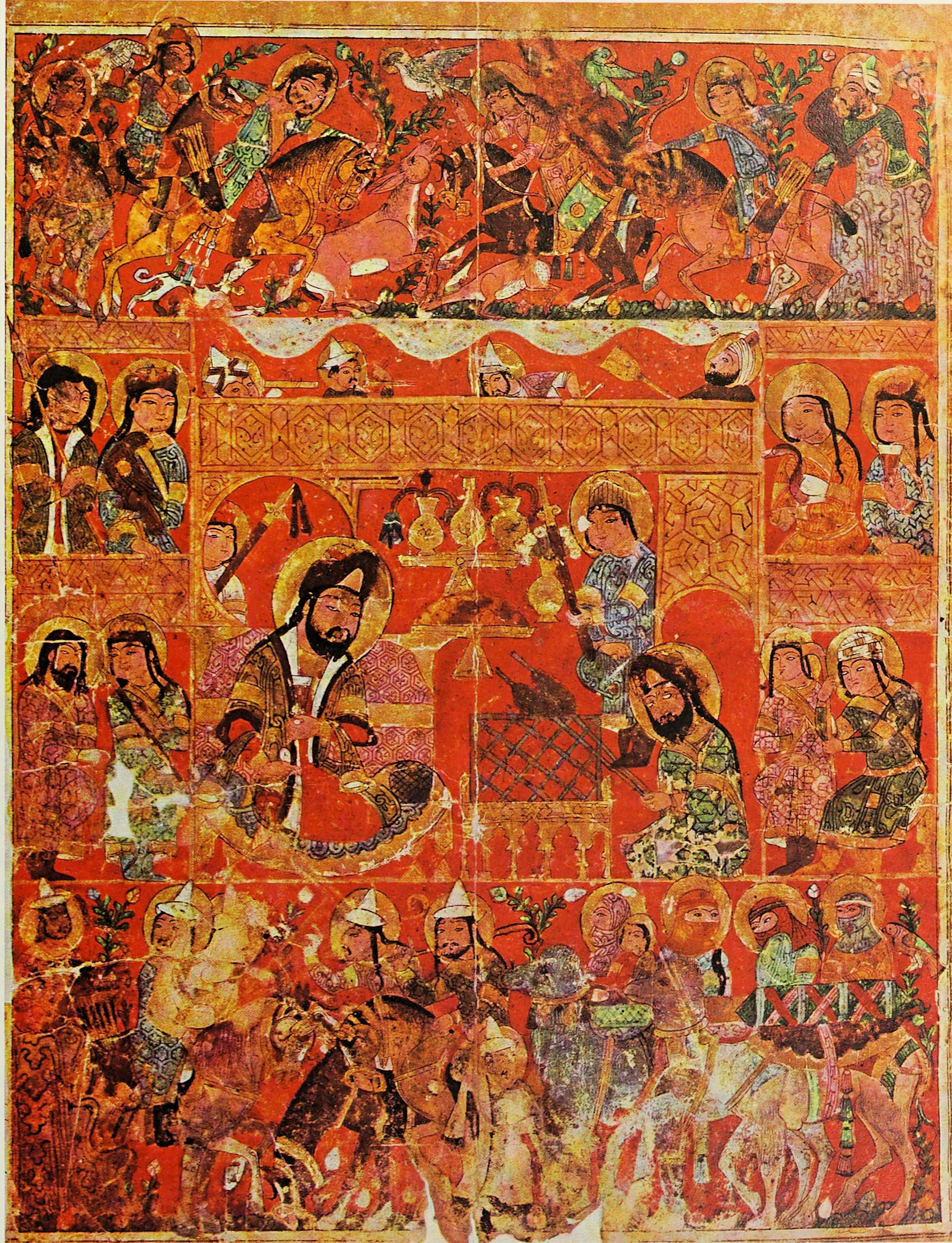
Scenes of the royal court. Probably northern Iraq (Mosul). Mid 13th century. Book of Antidotes of Pseudo-Gallen (Kitāb al-Diryāq). "In the paintings the facial cast of these [ruling] Turks is obviously reflected, and so are the special fashions and accoutrements they favored".

A mid-13th-century edition (second quarter of the 13th century, i.e. 1225–1250) of the manuscript Kitâb al-Diryâq, attributed to Mosul, is known from the Nationalbibliotek in Vienna (A.F. 10). Although there is no mention of a dedication in this edition, the courtly paintings are quite similar to those of the court of Badr al-Din Lu'lu' in the Kitab al-Aghani (1218–1219), and may be related to this ruler.

== Bibliography ==
- Bloom, J.M. and Blair, S.S. (eds.) (2009) The Grove Encyclopedia of Islamic Art and Architecture, Volume I: Abarquh to Dawlat Qatar, Oxford University Press, Oxford
- Canby, Sheila R.; Beyazit, Deniz; Rugiadi, Martina; Peacock, A. C. S. (27 April 2016). Court and Cosmos: The Great Age of the Seljuqs. Metropolitan Museum of Art. ISBN 978-1-58839-589-4.
- Rice, D. S. (October 1950). "The Brasses of Badr al-Dīn Lu'lu'". Bulletin of the School of Oriental and African Studies. 13 (3): 627–634. doi:10.1017/S0041977X00140042.
- Gibb, H.A.R. (1969) [1962]. "The Aiyubids". In Setton, Kenneth M.; Wolff, Robert Lee; Hazard, Harry W. (eds.). A History of the Crusades, Volume II: The Later Crusades, 1189–1311. Vol. 2 (Second ed.). Madison, Milwaukee, and London: University of Wisconsin Press. pp. 693–714. ISBN 0-299-04844-6.
- Kreyenbroek, P.G. and Rashow, K.J. (2005) God and Sheik Adi are Perfect, Harrassowitz Verlag, Wiesbaden
- Patton, D. (1988) Ibn al-Sāʿi's Account of the Last of the Zangids, Zeitschrift der Deutschen, Morgenländischen Gesellschaft, Vol. 138, No. 1, pp. 148–158, Harrassowitz Verlag Stable URL: https://www.jstor.org/stable/43377738
- Spengler, W.F. and Sayles, W.G. (1992) Turkoman Figural Bronze Coins and Their Iconography: The Artuquids, Clio's Cabinet, Lodi
- Venegoni, L. (2003). Transoxiana Webfestschrift Series I, Webfestschrift Marshak 2003. Eran ud Aneran: studies presented to Boris Il'ic Marsak on the occasion of his 70th birthday (1. ed.). Venezia: Cafoscarina. ISBN 8875431051.
