= Mausoleum of Yahya Abu al-Qasim =

Historic shrine in Mosul, Iraq

- Arabic: مرقد الامام يحيى أبو القاسم, romanized: Mashhad Yahya Abul Kassem
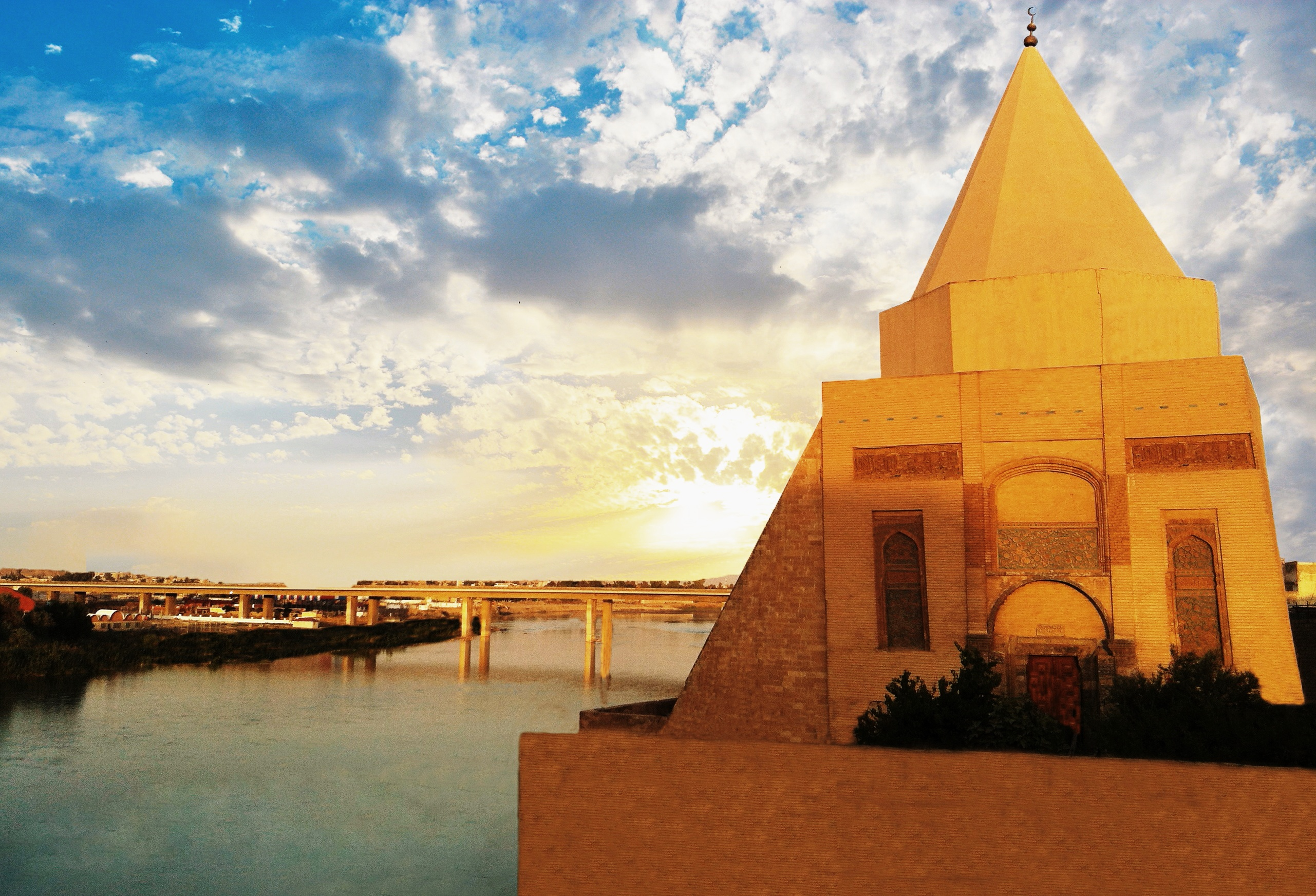

- Location in Iraq

Religion
- Affiliation: Islam
- Ecclesiastical or organizational status: Mosque and shrine
- Status: Destroyed

Location
- Location: Mosul, Iraq
- Interactive map of Mausoleum of Yahya Abu al-Qasim
- Coordinates: 36.3547°N 43.123°E

Architecture
- Type: Seljuk architecture
- Founder: Badr al-Din Lu'lu'
- Established: 799 CE
- Destroyed: 2014
- Interior area: 1,000 square metres (11,000 sq ft)

Mausoleum of Yahya Abu al-Qasim (Arabic: مرقد الامام يحيى أبو القاسم, romanized: Mashhad Yahya Abul Kassem) was a historic shrine and mosque located in Mosul, Iraq. In 2014 the mosque and shrine were destroyed by an explosive device claimed by soldiers of the Islamic State of Iraq and Levant.

== History ==
The mausoleum was located in Al-Shifa' neighborhood on the riverbank of the Tigris, nearby the Bash Tapia Castle. The mausoleum was built in 1239 during the reign of the Zangid ruler Badr al-Din Lu'lu'. It was built over a tomb dedicated to Yahya Abu al-Qasim, a descendant of the first Shia Imam and fourth Rashidun Caliph, Ali ibn Abi Talib.

In 2001, the new mosque was built next to the mausoleum, and the area reached approximately 1,000 square metres (11,000 sq ft).

== Construction ==
The architectural design of the structure is considered to be based on Seljuk architecture, including the columns, mihrab, and conical dome. The main building is a cube-shaped structure topped by a pyramidal roof raised on an octagonal drum, with an inner layer of muqarnas inside the pyramidal roof. On the north of the building was an entrance into the tomb. The building is not oriented towards Mecca and features a mihrab in the southwest corner of the tomb. The niches flanking the door of the building contained turquoise bricks forming interlocking stars and octagons, and had Kufic inscriptive panels below the crowning arch. There are similar niches on the west and south façades, placed on either side of a window.

The east façade of the tomb is covered by two heavy buttresses that were constructed to prevent the structure collapsing into the Tigris River due to erosion.

== Demolition ==
In 2014, the whole mosque and the mausoleum was destroyed by an explosive device claimed by soldiers of the Islamic State of Iraq and Levant as part of the campaign to demolish all the historic mausoleums and shrines in Mosul.

== See also ==
- Destruction of cultural heritage by the Islamic State
- Islam in Iraq
- List of mosques in Iraq
- List of Islamic structures in Mosul
