= Sayf al-Din Ghazi II =

- Emir of Mosul
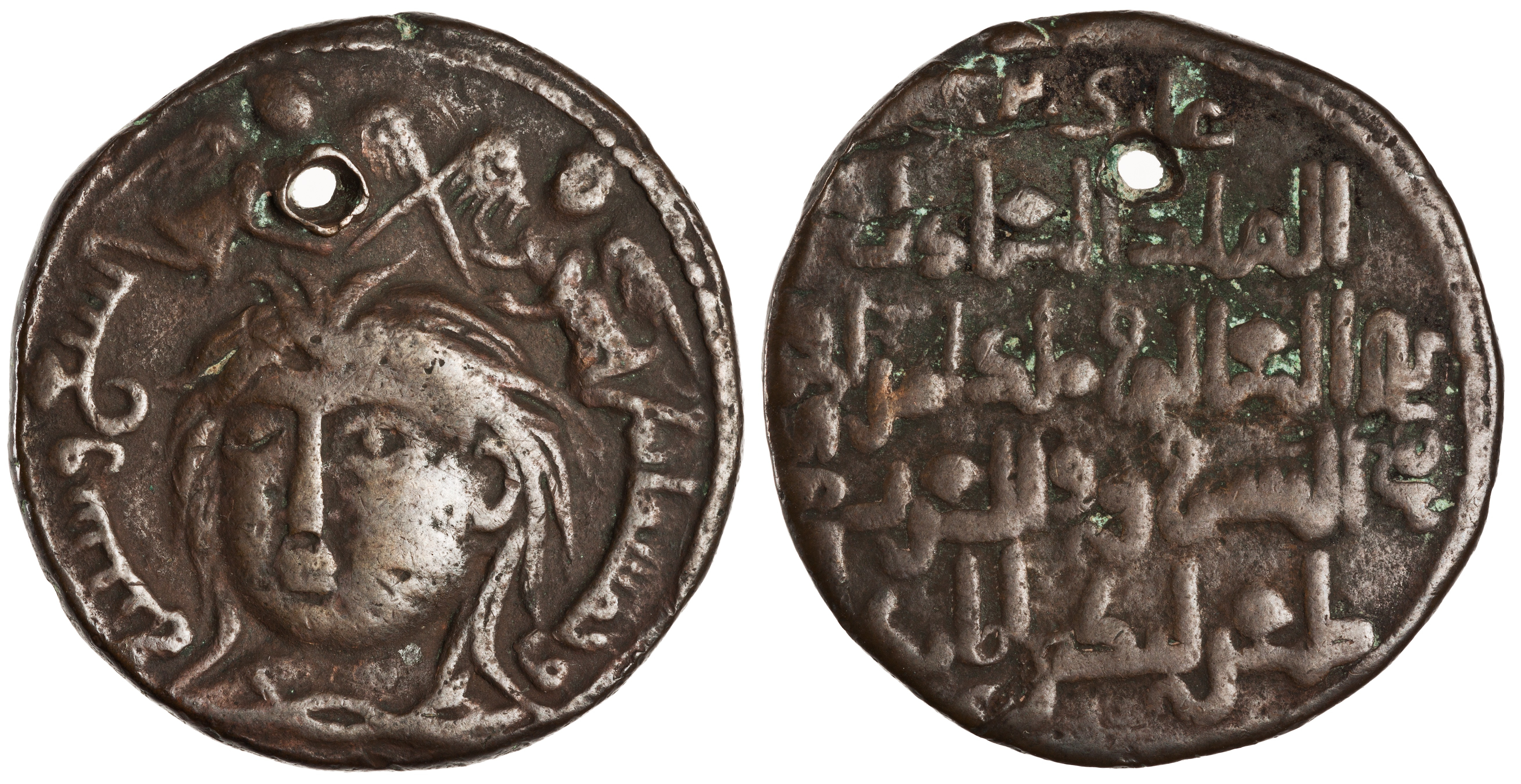
- Coinage of Saif ad-Din (r.1170-1180), Zengid ruler of Mosul. Dated 569 H (1173-1174 CE). Obverse: Draped male bust facing slightly left, wearing foreknot; above, winged figures; AH date in fields. Reverse: Name and title of Saif al-Din Ghazi II in four lines and in margins.

Zengid Atabeg of Mosul
- Reign: 1170-1180
- Predecessor: Qutb al-Din Mawdud
- Successor: Izz ad-Din Mas'ud
- Born: 1149
- Died: 1180 (aged 31)
Names
- Sayf al-Din Ghazi II ibn Qutb al-Din Mawdud ibn Imad al-Din Zengi
- House: Zengid Dynasty
- Father: Qutb al-Din Mawdud
- Religion: Sunni Islam

Sayf al-Din Ghazi (II) ibn Mawdud (Arabic: سيف الدين غازي بن مودود, romanized: Sayf ad-Dīn Ghāzī ibn Mawdūd, died 1180) was a Zangid Emir of Mosul, the nephew of Nur ad-Din Zengi.

He became Emir of Mosul in 1170 after the death of his father Qutb ad-Din Mawdud. Saif had been chosen as the successor under the advice of eunuch ’Abd al-Rahim, who wanted to keep the effective rule in lieu of the young emir; the disinherited son of Mawdud, Imad ad-Din Zengi II, fled to Aleppo at the court of Nur ad-Din. The latter, who was waiting for an excuse to annex Mosul, conquered Sinjar and Tal Afar in September 1170 and besieged Mosul, which surrendered on 22 January 1171. After ousting 'Abd al-Rahim, he put Gümüshtekin, one of his officers, as governor, leaving Saif ud-Din nothing but the nominal title of emir. The latter also married the daughter of Nur ad-Din.

At Nur ad-Din's death (May 1174), Gümüshtekin went to Damascus to take control of his son and entitled himself of atabeg of Aleppo. Saif ud-Din rejected his tutorage and restored his independence. The nobles of Damascus, worried by Gümüshtekin's increasing power, offered Saif ud-Din their city, but he could not intervene since he was busy in retaking Mosul. Thenceforth Damascus was given to Saladin.

Saladin took control of Biladu-Sham (Syria) but Saif ud-Din wanted to take over Aleppo, so he sent his brother Izz ad-Din Mas'ud at the head of an army to fight Saladin: they met in an area near Hama called Quroun Hama (Arabic: قرون حماه) where Saif ud-Din was defeated in the Battle of the Horns of Hama. Later he prepared for another battle at Tell al-Sultan (Arabic: تل سلطان) near Aleppo, where he was also defeated; he went back to Mosul and sent messengers to Saladin offering his alliance, which was accepted.

Saif ud-Din died from tuberculosis, and his brother Izz ad-Din Mas'ud succeeded him in 1180.

== Sources ==
- Grousset (1935). Histoire des croisades et du royaume franc de Jérusalem – II. 1131–1187 L'équilibre.

Regnal titles
Preceded by Qutb al-Din Mawdud	Emir of Mosul; 1170–1180	Succeeded by Izz al-Din Mas'ud
