= Izz al-Din Mas'ud =

Izz al-Din Mas'ud (I)
- Emir of Mosul
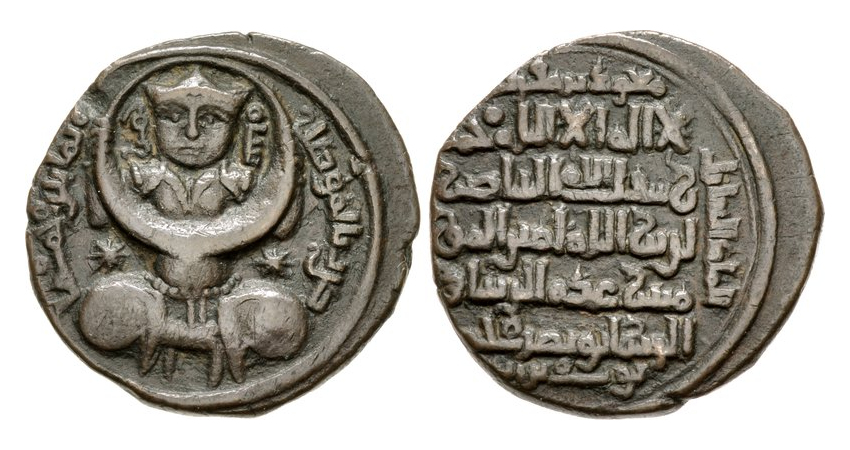
- Coinage of Izz al-Din Mas'ud, with crowned Turkic figure holding a moon symbol. Mosul mint, dated 1189-90. The reverse mentions the name and titles of the Abbasid caliph and Abbasid heir presumptive in five lines, and the name and titles of the Ayyubid overlord Saladin, and 'Izz al-Din Mas'ud.
- Reign: 1181-1193
- Predecessor: Sayf al-Din Ghazi II
- Successor: Nur al-Din Arslan Shah I
- Died: 1193
Names
- Izz al-Din Mas'ud (I) ibn Qutb al-Din Mawdud
- House: Zengid Dynasty
- Father: Qutb al-Din Mawdud

Izz al-Din Mas'ud (I) ibn Mawdud (Arabic: عز الدين مسعود بن مودود died 1193) was a Zengid emir of Mosul.

== Biography ==
Izz al-Din Mas'ud was the brother of emir Sayf al-Din Ghazi II, and the leader of his armies. When his brother died in 1180, he became the governor of Aleppo. When As-Salih Ismail al-Malik the titular head of the dynasty became ill, he indicated in his will that Izz al-Din Mas'ud should succeed him; when he died in 1181, Izz al-Din rushed to Aleppo, fearing that Saladin the sovereign of Egypt would try to conquer it. When he arrived to Aleppo, he got into its citadel, took over all the money and the gold and married the mother of As-Salih Ismail al-Malik. Izz al-Din Mas'ud realised he couldn't keep Aleppo and Mosul under his governance, as Saladin was intent on gaining control of Aleppo, so he reached an agreement with his brother Imad al-Din Zengi II the governor of Sinjar to exchange Sinjar with Aleppo; in 1182 Izz al-Din became the governor of Sinjar. Saladin continued his hostility to the remaining Zengid power in northern Syria and Upper Mesopotamia until 1186, when hostilities ended. Peace was made upon the submission of Izz al-Din Mas'ud, who agreed to become Saladin's vassal. In 1193 he was residing in Mosul where he became ill and died. He was succeeded by his son Nur al-Din Arslan Shah I.

== Bibliography ==
- Runciman, Steven (1952). A History of the Crusades, Volume II: The Kingdom of Jerusalem and the Frankish East, 1100–1187. Cambridge, United Kingdom: Cambridge University Press.

Regnal titles
Preceded by Sayf al-Din Ghazi II	Emir of Mosul; 1180–1193	Succeeded by Nur al-Din Arslan Shah I
