= Nur al-Din Arslan Shah II =

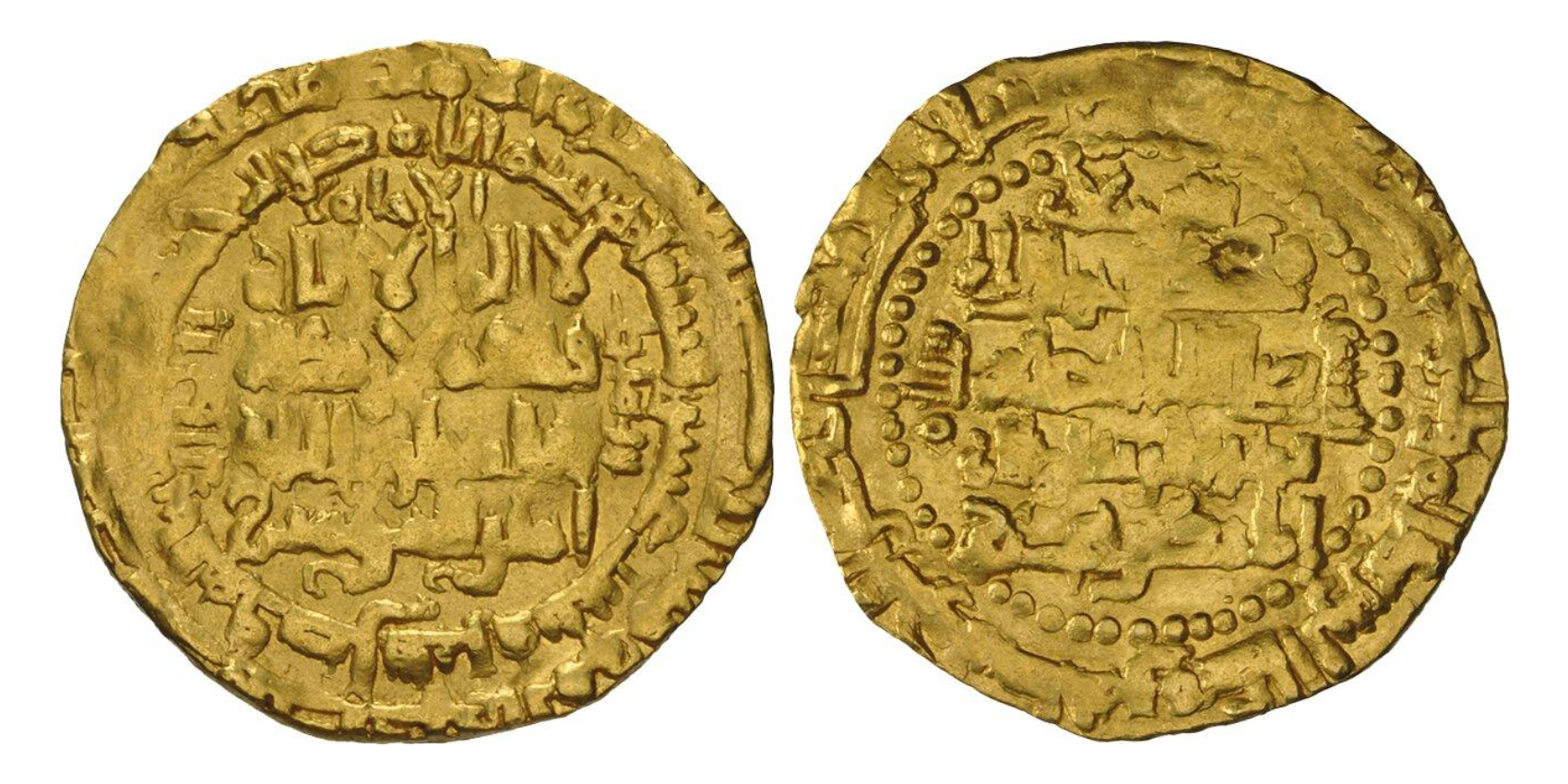
Coinage of Nur al-Din Arslan Shah II (ruled 1218-1219 CE). al-Mawsil (Mosul) mint. Dated AH 616 (1219/1220 CE).

Nur al-Din Arslan Shah II (r.1218-1219) was the son and successor of Izz al-Din Mas'ud II, as Zengid dynasty ruler of the Mosul region in modern Iraq. He was under the control of a regent or atabeg, in the person of the mamluk, Badr al-Dīn Lū'lū'.

== Sources ==
Canby, Sheila R.; Beyazit, Deniz; Rugiadi, Martina; Peacock, A. C. S. (27 April 2016). Court and Cosmos: The Great Age of the Seljuqs. Metropolitan Museum of Art. p. 60, item 10. ISBN 978-1-58839-589-4.

== See also ==
- Zengid dynasty

Regnal titles
Preceded by Izz al-Din Mas'ud II	Emir of Mossul; 1218–1219	Succeeded by Nasir ad-Din Mahmud
