= Mausoleum of Imam Awn Al-Din =

Islamic shrine

Mausoleum of Imam Awn al-Din ibn al-Hasan
- Arabic: مشهد الامام عون الدين, romanized: Mashhad Al-Imam Awn Al-Din
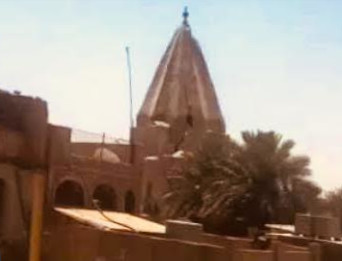
- The Mausoleum of Imam Awn al-Din, as seen on the same day of its demolition by ISIL.

Religion
- Affiliation: Islam
- Ecclesiastical or organisational status: shrine
- Status: Destroyed

Location
- Location: Mosul, Iraq
- Interactive map of Mausoleum of Imam Awn al-Din ibn al-Hasan

Architecture
- Type: Abbasid
- Founder: Badr al-Din Lu'lu'
- Established: 1248
- Destroyed: 2014
- Interior area: 1,000 square metres (11,000 sq ft)

The Mausoleum of Imam Awn al-Din (Arabic: مشهد الامام عون الين, romanized: Mashhad Al-Imam Awn Al-Din) was a historic shrine that was located in Mosul, Iraq. In 2014 the shrine was destroyed by the Islamic State of Iraq and Levant.

== History ==
The mausoleum was built in 1248 by the Atabeg of Mosul, Badr al-Din Lu'lu. It was built over the tomb of Imam Awn al-Din, the son of the Prophet's companion, and second Shiite imam Hasan ibn Ali. The structure was restored twice, first in 1744 and then 1776. In 1964, the exterior was covered with plaster, hiding the external decorations.

== Construction ==
The mausoleum was cube-shaped and entered on its North side. It was topped by a recessed cube, which was a support for the octagonal base of the twelve-sided conical, pyramidal brick dome.The mihrab was found in the southwest corner of the shrine and consists of two panels that join at the corner to form a niche. The decorations on both the exterior and interior included extensive floral motifs and an inscription band again revealing the unnecessary name of Badr al-Din Lu'lu and its date of construction in 1248. The wooden sarcophagus of Imam Awn al-Din ibn al-Hasan ibn Ali was carved with floral motifs on its exterior. It also holds an inscription to Badr al-Din Lu'lu.

On the east of the tomb chamber was an iwan. In front of the iwan, there was a private cemetery reserved for Ottoman Pashas and their relatives.

During the 1964 restoration, the lower part of the building was covered with a thick layer of plaster. The upper layer which held the brick decoration was covered with a thin layer of white plaster.

== 2014 demolition ==
The Mausoleum of Imam Awn al-Din was destroyed with explosives in July 2014 by the Islamic State of Iraq and the Levant.
