= Nasir ad-Din Mahmud =

Nasir al-Din Mahmud
- Emir of Mosul
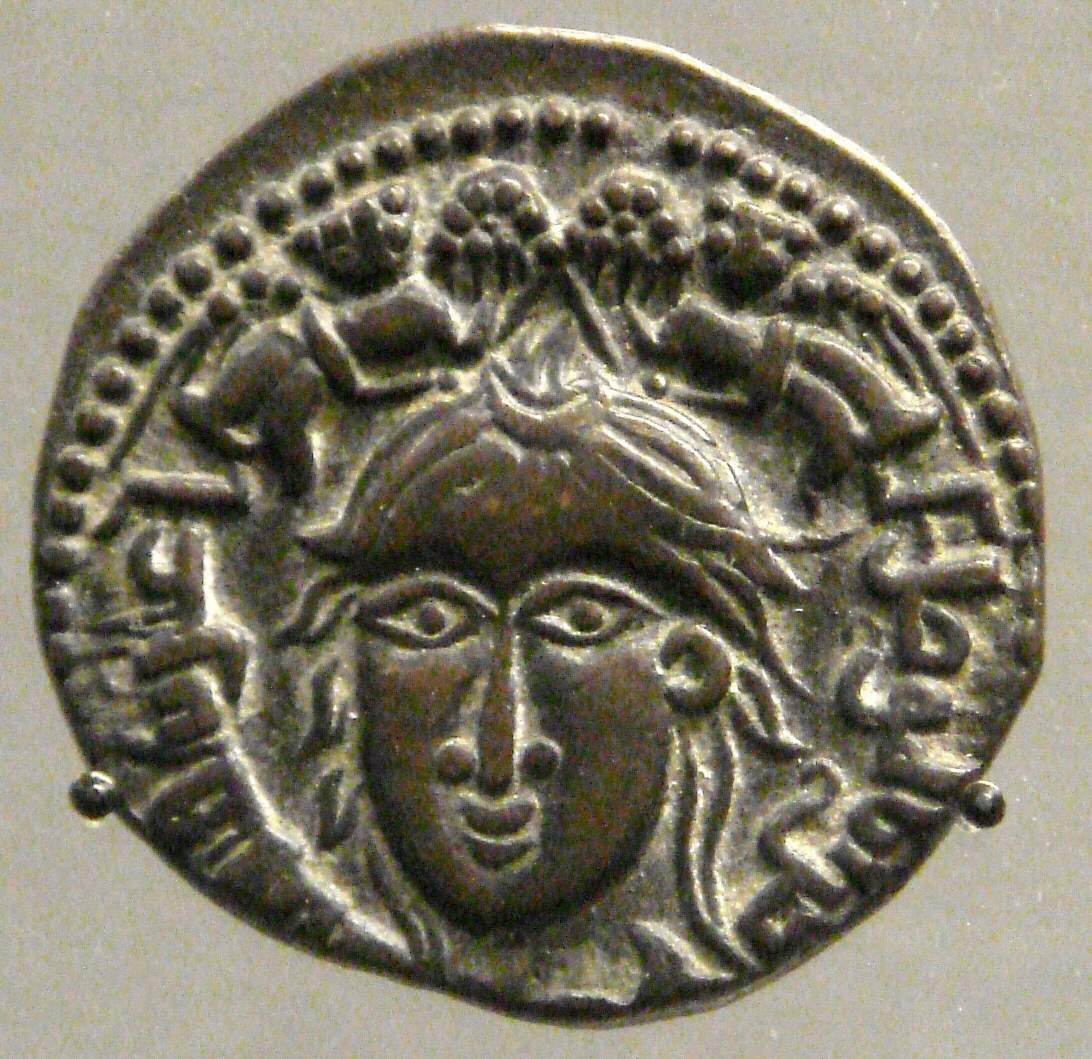
- Coin of Mahmud II, mint of Mossul, depicting a female with two winged victories, 1223.
- Rule: 1219 – 1234
- Predecessor: Nur al-Din Arslan Shah II
- Successor: Badr al-Din Lu'lu' (as Mamluk emir of Mosul)
- Born: 1216
- Died: 1234 (aged 17–18)
- House: Zengid
- Religion: Sunni Islam

Nasir al-Din Mahmud, born in 1216, was the Zengid hereditary Emir of Mosul from 1219 to 1234 (died 18 years old). He was successor to his brother Nur al-Din Arslan Shah II, and was only three years old when he ascended the throne. He was the last Zengid ruler of Mosul, and remained under the control of the atabeg of Mosul, Badr al-Din Lu'lu'. Badr al-Din Lu'lu' may have assassinated the young ruler following the death of his maternal grandfather the Emir of Erbil, Muzaffar al-Din Gökböri. Lu'lu' then began to rule Mosul in his own right.

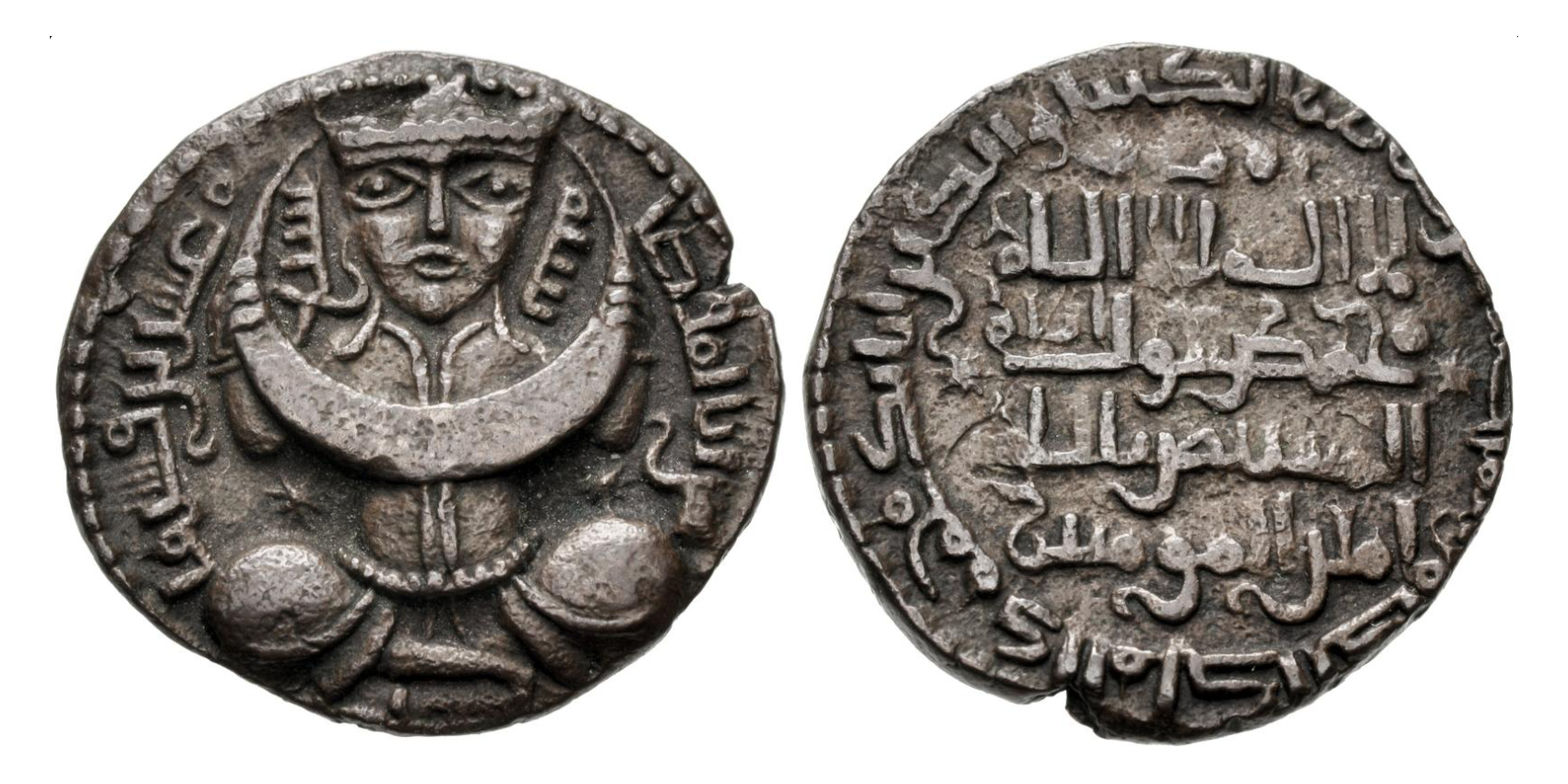
Nasir al-Din Mahmud. AH 616-631 (1219-1234 CE) al-Mawsil mint. Dated AH 627 (1231-2 CE). Obverse: Crowned Turkic figure, holding crescent-circle, seated facing between two stars; mint formula and AH date around. Reverse: Kalima and name and titles of Abbasid caliph in five lines; name and titles of Nasir al-Din Mahmud in outer margin.

== Bibliography ==
- Patton, D. (1988) Ibn al-Sāʿi's Account of the Last of the Zangids, Zeitschrift der Deutschen, Morgenländischen Gesellschaft, Vol. 138, No. 1, pp. 148-158, Harrassowitz Verlag Stable URL: https://www.jstor.org/stable/43377738

Regnal titles
| Preceded by Nur al-Din Arslan Shah II | Emir of Mosul; 1219–1234 | Succeeded by Badr al-Din Lu'lu' (non-dynastic) |

== See also ==
- Zengid dynasty
