= Akhu Muhsin =

10th-century Islamic scholar and writer

Akhu Muhsin أخو محسن
- Died: 985/6
- Other names: Abu'l-Husayn Muhammad ibn Ali
- Occupation: Islamic scholar
- Years active: 960s – 985
- Era: Shia Century
- Children: Husayn
- Father: Ali

Abu'l-Husayn Muhammad ibn Ali (Arabic: أبو الحسين محمد بن علي), better known by his nickname Akhu Muhsin (أخو محسن), was a 10th-century anti-Isma'ili writer.

Himself of Alid descent, Akhu Muhsin lived in Damascus, and was one of the first writers interested in Alid genealogy. Based to a large degree on the previous anti-Isma'ili tract of Ibn Rizam, which now survives only in fragmentary form, he composed his own treatise against the Fatimid Caliphate and their Isma'ili adherents c. 980, at a time when the Fatimids were trying to expand their rule over Syria and conquer Damascus. It too does not survive but in fragments, incorporated in the works of the later historians al-Nuwayri, Ibn al-Dawadari, and al-Maqrizi.

From the fragments, it appears that Akhu Muhsin's work contained separate parts dealing with history and doctrine. However, already al-Maqrizi condemned both Akhu Muhsin and Ibn Rizam as unreliable. Indeed, the work introduced extensive quotations from an anonymous tract, the Kitāb al-siyāsa ("Book of Methodology" or "Book of the Highest Initiation"), which purported to be an Isma'ili work describing methods of winning new converts and initiating them into the secrets of the Isma'ili doctrine. Its fabricated content was tailored to justify the rejection of the Isma'ilis as antinomian atheists and libertines, and ensured it a long existence as the main source for "several generations of polemicists and heresiographers" targeting the Isma'ilis. Ibn Rizam and Akhu Mahsin's account thus "provided the basis for most subsequent Sunni writing", notably the public denunciation of the Fatimids in the Baghdad Manifesto of 1011, sponsored by the Abbasid caliph al-Qadir. Their work thus became the accepted version outside the Isma'ili community, not only on Isma'ili doctrine, but also on the origins of the Isma'ili movement, including in Western scholarly circles, until the beginning of a more critical evaluation of the historical sources in the 20th century.

Akhu Mahsin died in c. 985/6.

== Sources ==
- Daftary, Farhad (2007). The Ismāʿı̄lı̄s: Their History and Doctrines (Second ed.). Cambridge: Cambridge University Press. ISBN 978-0-521-61636-2.
- Hajnal, István (1994). "The Background Motives of the Qarmaṭī Policy in Baḥrayn". The Arabist: Budapest Studies in Arabic. 8. Budapest: Eötvös Lorand University Chair for Arabic and Semitic Studies: 9–31. ISSN 0239-1619.
- Halm, Heinz (2003). Die Kalifen von Kairo: Die Fatimiden in Ägypten, 973–1074 [The Caliphs of Cairo: The Fatimids in Egypt, 973–1074] (in German). Munich: C. H. Beck. ISBN 3-406-48654-1.
