= Sabur ibn Ardashir =

Abu Nasr Baha al-Din Sabur ibn Ardashir (Arabic: ابونصر بهاء الدين شاپور بن اردشیر; also spelled Shapur) was a Persian statesman who served as the vizier of the Buyids of Iraq five times between 990/1 to 1000.

== Biography ==
Sabur was born in 942 or May 948 at Shiraz. An adherent of Zaydi Shi'ism, he is described by C. E. Bosworth as a " taciturn and exacting functionary, adept at extracting money for his masters".

He began his career as deputy in Baghdad of the vizier Abu Mansur ibn Salihan, whom he then succeeded in 990. His first tenure was of brief duration, being arrested a year later, and escaping to the Batihah marshlands after his release, where he possessed estates and some sort of power base, that often served as a refuge in his career.

Sabur was re-appointed to the vizierate on 10 October 992, jointly with Ibn Salihan, until they both resigned their office following a mutiny of the Dailamite soldiery in 993/4. Their successor, Abu'l-Qasim Ali ibn Ahmad al-Abarquhi, did not last long in the office, fleeing in turn to Batihah, so that Sabur was appointed vizier again in the same year. This vizierate lasted until 994/5, when he was dismissed and replaced by none other than Ali al-Abarquhi, whom he succeeded again in 996/7 for two months. In 1000, he again served as vizier in Baghdad, but had to flee in December after the Turkic soldiers mutinied. Nevertheless, in August/September 1001 he was appointed governor of Iraq alongside al-Hajjaj ibn Ustadh Hurmuz, until March/April 1002, when he again fled to the marshlands.

Sabur was captured in November/December 1002, and later released. He withdrew from Buyid politics, and spent the rest of his life in Baghdad, where died in 1025/6.

He is best remembered for his patronage of scholars and poets, as well as the foundation of a college (dar al-ilm) in the Bayn al-Surayn quarter of Baghdad, with a library of 10,000 books. The library was burned during the occupation of Baghdad by the Seljuk Turks in 1055-1056.

== Sources ==
- Bloom, Jonathan M. (2001). Paper Before Print: The History and Impact of Paper in the Islamic World. Yale University Press. ISBN 0-300-08955-4.
- Bosworth, C. E. (1995). "Sābūr b. Ardas̲h̲īr". In Bosworth, C. E.; van Donzel, E.; Heinrichs, W. P. & Lecomte, G. (eds.). The Encyclopaedia of Islam, Second Edition. Volume VIII: Ned–Sam. Leiden: E. J. Brill. p. 694. ISBN 978-90-04-09834-3.
- Busse, Heribert (2004) [1969]. Chalif und Grosskönig - Die Buyiden im Irak (945-1055) [Caliph and Great King - The Buyids in Iraq (945-1055)] (in German). Würzburg: Ergon Verlag. ISBN 3-89913-005-7.

Preceded by Abu Mansur ibn Salihan	Vizier of the Buyid emirate of Iraq; 990–991	Succeeded by Abu'l-Qasim Abd al-Aziz ibn Yusuf
Vacant Title last held by Abu'l-Qasim Ali ibn Ahmad al-Abarquhi	Vizier of the Buyid emirate of Iraq; 992–993/4; With: Abu Mansur ibn Salihan	Succeeded by Abu'l-Qasim Ali ibn Ahmad al-Abarquhi
Preceded by Abu'l-Qasim Ali ibn Ahmad al-Abarquhi	Vizier of the Buyid emirate of Iraq; 993/4–995/6	Succeeded by Abu'l-Qasim Ali ibn Ahmad al-Abarquhi
Preceded by Abu'l-Qasim Ali ibn Ahmad al-Abarquhi	Vizier of the Buyid emirate of Iraq; 996/7	Succeeded by Abu'l-Abbas Isa ibn Sargish
Preceded by Abu'l-Abbas Isa ibn Sargish	Vizier of the Buyid emirate of Iraq; 1000–1002	Succeeded by Hasan ibn Ustadh-Hurmuz
