= Ali ibn al-Musayyab =

Ruler of Uqaylid Mosul

Janah al-Dawla
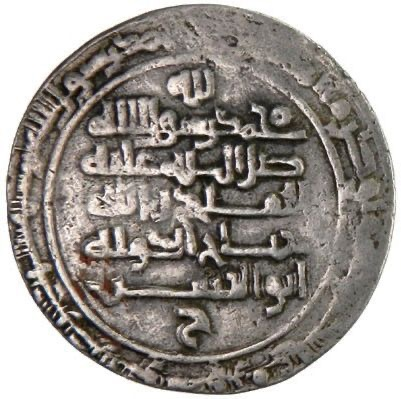
- Silver Dirham citing Ali ibn al-Musayyab using his laqab: Janah al-Dawla Abu al-Hasan

Co-Amir of Mosul
- Co-rulership: 996–1001?
- Predecessor: Abu Ja'far al-Hajjaj
- Successor: Hasan ibn al-Musayyab
- Co-Amir: Husam al-Dawla
Names
- Janah al-Dawla Ali ibn al-Musayyab ibn Rafi
- Dynasty: Uqaylids
- Father: al-Musayyab ibn Rafi

Abu al-Hasan Ali ibn al-Musayyab (Arabic: أَبُو الحَسَنْ عَلِيُّ بْنُ المُسَيَّبْ, romanized: Abū al-Ḥasan ʿAlī ibn al-Musayyab), also known by the honorific Janah al-Dawla (Arabic: جناح الدولة), was co-ruler of Uqaylid Mosul alongside his brother Al-Muqallad ibn al-Musayyab from the death of his predecessor and brother Muhammad ibn al-Musayyab in 996 until his own death sometime before 1001. He was succeeded by his younger brother Hasan ibn al-Musayyab as co-ruler. He has been characterised by historians as representing the "traditional, Bedouin aspect" of the Uqaylid state in juxtaposition to his brother's own style of governing.

== Career ==
Upon the death of his elder brother in 996 Ali assumed leadership of the Banu Uqayl, the tribe which his family belonged to, however he was prevented from taking control of the Mosul and the authority to farm tarm within the area, which had been initially granted to his father Muhummad by the Buyid Amir al-umara Baha al-Dawla. He was unable to retain these powers even though the local Buyids had lost effective control in the region after the death of the previous Amir and governor Abu Jafar Al-Hajjaj, due to the military and financial power of his brother Al-Muqallad. Initially Ali accepted his brother's position as sole ruler, however by 997 conflict had erupted between the two as Ali sought to take these powers away from Al-Muqallad. The war was ended by a compromise between the two brothers at the behest of their sister where they decided to split the revenues between themselves, effectively granting Ali co-regency over Mosul. His authority was confirmed by the granting of the honorific "Janah al-Dawla" by the Buyid amir.

Upon his death he was succeeded by younger brother Hasan as co-ruler of the Uqaylid state.

== Primary Sources ==
- ibn Miskawayh, Abu Ali Ahmad. Tajarib al-Umam [Experiences of Nations]. Baghdad.
