= Book of the Highest Initiation =

False text attributed to 'Ubayd Allah

The Book of the Highest Initiation (also known as “The Book of the Policy and the Highest Initiation” - Arabic: “Kitab as-Siyasa wa’l-Balagh al-Akhbar”) is a text that falsely claims to be of Ismaili origin and is wrongfully attributed to ‘Ubayd Allah, or Abdullah al-Mahdi Billah, the first Fatimid Caliph-Imam. The work is a false account of Ismaili initiation and was written with the intent of denigrating Ismaili beliefs and practices. It is included in the polemic work of the 10th-century anti-Ismaili writer Akhu Muhsin.

== The author ==
The actual creator of this text is unknown, but evidence reveals that the author constructed this false account of Ismaili initiation rituals as part of a larger anti-Fatimid propaganda campaign initiated by Abbasid supporters in the 10th century.

== The work ==
By the tenth century, the Fatimid Caliphate posed a dangerous threat to Abbasid hegemony. In response to this threat, the Abbasid Caliph initiated a large-scale propaganda campaign to challenge the legitimacy of Fatimid Caliphs and to present Ismailism as an un-Islamic heresy that is a danger to Muslims. For example, texts such as the Baghdad Manifesto, which was written and signed by Abbasid scholars, claimed that the Fatimid Caliph-Imams were not descendants of ‘Ali. But other texts, such as The Book of the Highest Initiation, were created to appear as genuine Ismaili works.

The full text of The Book of the Highest Initiation does not survive, but scholar S.M. Stern has reconstructed the text of the pamphlet using several sources.

The text claims to be a letter written by Fatimid Caliph-Imam Abdullah al-Mahdi Billah to his missionaries working to convert people to Ismailism. It is written as an instruction manual, organized into 35 short paragraphs.

The account begins with instruction about how to attract converts from a multitude of different backgrounds, including Christians, Jews, Zoroastrians, Manichaeans, philosophers, and Sunni Muslims.

The pamphlet instructs that initiates must swear an oath before the missionaries begin to reveal more about their beliefs. It goes on to claim that there are 7 grades of initiation, each one moving closer and closer to total sacrilege. At the final stage, the initiate is “dispensed from the religious practices” altogether.

The goal of this text was to present Ismailism as a system that leads to complete departure from religion. Its depicts the faith as not only foreign to Islam, but also insidiously dangerous to it.

The contents of this fabricated text do not reflect the beliefs or practices of Ismailis. It is true, however, that the Fatimid da’wah system was engaged in recruiting converts to their faith throughout the dar al-Islam. These Da’is were successful in attracting converts from a wide range of backgrounds. The author of The Book of the Highest Initiation, clearly threatened by the success of these missions, intentionally demeans the Ismaili mission and accuses it of manipulating its adherents into disbelief and departure from religion.

== The legacy ==
This work has had a large influence on the historical depiction and understanding of Ismailism. The idea that there were ‘7 grades of initiation’ had a particularly long afterlife.

Because authentic Ismaili documents were unavailable to a general readership until recently, slanderous and fabricated works such as this one were thought to be accurate depictions of Ismaili religion.

S.M. Stern relates that even in the beginning of the 20th century, some Western academics thought that this account revealed the “secret doctrine of the Isma’ilis.”

With the publication and circulation of authentically Ismaili texts, a wide non-Ismaili readership can now recognize the falsity of this text and appreciate the genuine teachings of the Isma’ili da’wah.

== Sources ==
- Daftary, Farhad (2007). The Ismāʿı̄lı̄s: Their History and Doctrines (2nd ed.). Cambridge University Press. ISBN 978-0-521-61636-2.
- Glassé, Cyril. The New Encyclopedia of Islam. Fourth Edition. Lanham, Maryland: Rowman & Littlefield Publishers, 2013.
- Stern, S. M. “The ‘Book of the Highest Initiation’ and Other Anti-Ismaili Travesties.” In Studies in Early Ismāʻīlism, 56-83. Max Schloessinger Memorial Series. Jerusalem: Magnes Press, Hebrew University; Leiden: E.J. Brill, 1983.
