= Abu Abdallah al-Husayn ibn Nasir al-Dawla =

Abu Abdallah al-Husayn

Emir of Mosul
- Reign: 989–990
- Co-ruler: Abu Tahir Ibrahim
Names
- Abu Abdallah al-Husayn ibn Nasir al-Dawla
- Dynasty: Hamdanid
- Father: Nasir al-Dawla
- Religion: Twelver Shi'a Islam

Abu Abdallah al-Husayn ibn Nasir al-Dawla was a Hamdanid prince, who along with his brother Ibrahim was the last Hamdanid ruler of Mosul in 989–990. After his defeat at the hand of the Marwanid Kurds and the takeover of Mosul by the Uqaylids, he entered the service of the Fatimid Caliphate.

== Life ==
Family tree of the Hamdanid dynasty

Al-Husayn was a younger son of the founder of the Hamdanid emirate of Mosul, Nasir al-Dawla (r. 935–967). Nasir al-Dawla was succeeded by his son Abu Taghlib, who had to confront uprisings by his half-brother Hamdan, and conflicts with the Byzantine Empire and the Buyid emir of Iraq, Adud al-Dawla, who finally captured Mosul in 978 and forced Abu Taghlib to flee to Syria. Al-Husayn, however, along with his brother Ibrahim, apparently submitted to the Buyids and entered their service, or were possibly kept as hostages in Baghdad.

During the 980s, Mosul was threatened by the Kurdish chieftain Badh ibn Dustak. Left without support from Baghdad, the local Buyid governor turned to the local Arab tribes of the Banu Uqayl and the Banu Numayr for assistance. This threatened Buyid control of the area as much as the Kurds, and in 989, the new Buyid emir, Baha al-Dawla, allowed the Hamdanid brothers to return to Mosul, in the hope that their local ties would mobilize opposition against Badh, and keep the Arab tribes reined in.

The Hamdanids were indeed received with enthusiasm by the local population, to such a degree that they rose in revolt and expelled the Buyid governor from Mosul. The Uqayl backed the Hamdanids, and received control of the towns of Jazirat ibn Umar, Nisibis, and Balad (north of Mosul), in exchange. Exploiting the turmoil, Badh attacked Mosul in the next year, but was defeated and killed by the numerically inferior Uqayl forces under al-Husayn in battle near Balad. A Hamdanid counter-offensive followed in the region of Amida against Badh's successor, Abu Ali al-Hasan ibn Marwan, but failed to score any success. Indeed, al-Husayn was taken prisoner during the campaign. His brother Ibrahim fled to Uqaylid-held Nisibis, where Muhammad took him and his son Ali prisoner and killed them. The Uqaylid dynasty thus usurped the Hamdanids as emirs of Mosul.

Al-Husayn was released shortly after, through the intercession of the Fatimid caliph, al-Aziz, and found refuge in the Fatimid domains in Syria. Al-Aziz intended to make use of him in his designs against the Emirate of Aleppo, ruled by the Syrian branch of the Hamdanid dynasty: al-Husayn was intended as governor of the city, should the Fatimids manage to conquer it. Throughout the early 990s, the Fatimids tried to conquer the city but failed, in large part due to Byzantine intervention. In 996, shortly before al-Aziz's death, al-Husayn was appointed governor of Tyre, and tasked with suppressing the city's revolt.

His grandson, Nasir al-Dawla ibn Hamdan, served the Fatimids as governor of Syria, before becoming involved in the civil war that nearly shattered the Fatimid state in the late 1060s. He seized Cairo and even attempted to depose the Fatimids and restore the country to Abbasid allegiance, but was murdered along with his brother in 1072/3.

== Sources ==
- Busse, Heribert (2004) [1969]. Chalif und Grosskönig - Die Buyiden im Irak (945-1055) [Caliph and Great King - The Buyids in Iraq (945-1055)] (in German). Würzburg: Ergon Verlag. ISBN 3-89913-005-7.
- Canard, Marius (1971). "Ḥamdānids". In Lewis, B.; Ménage, V. L.; Pellat, Ch. & Schacht, J. (eds.). The Encyclopaedia of Islam, Second Edition. Volume III: H–Iram. Leiden: E. J. Brill. pp. 126–131. OCLC 495469525.
- Gil, Moshe (1997) [1983]. A History of Palestine, 634–1099. Translated by Ethel Broido. Cambridge: Cambridge University Press. ISBN 0-521-59984-9.
- Kennedy, Hugh (2004) [1986]. The Prophet and the Age of the Caliphates: The Islamic Near East from the 6th to the 11th Century (Second ed.). Harlow: Longman. ISBN 978-0-582-40525-7.

Vacant Buyid rule Title last held by Abu Taghlib	Emir of Mosul; 989–990; With: Abu Tahir Ibrahim	Succeeded by Muhammad ibn al-Musayyab
