= Qirwash ibn al-Muqallad =

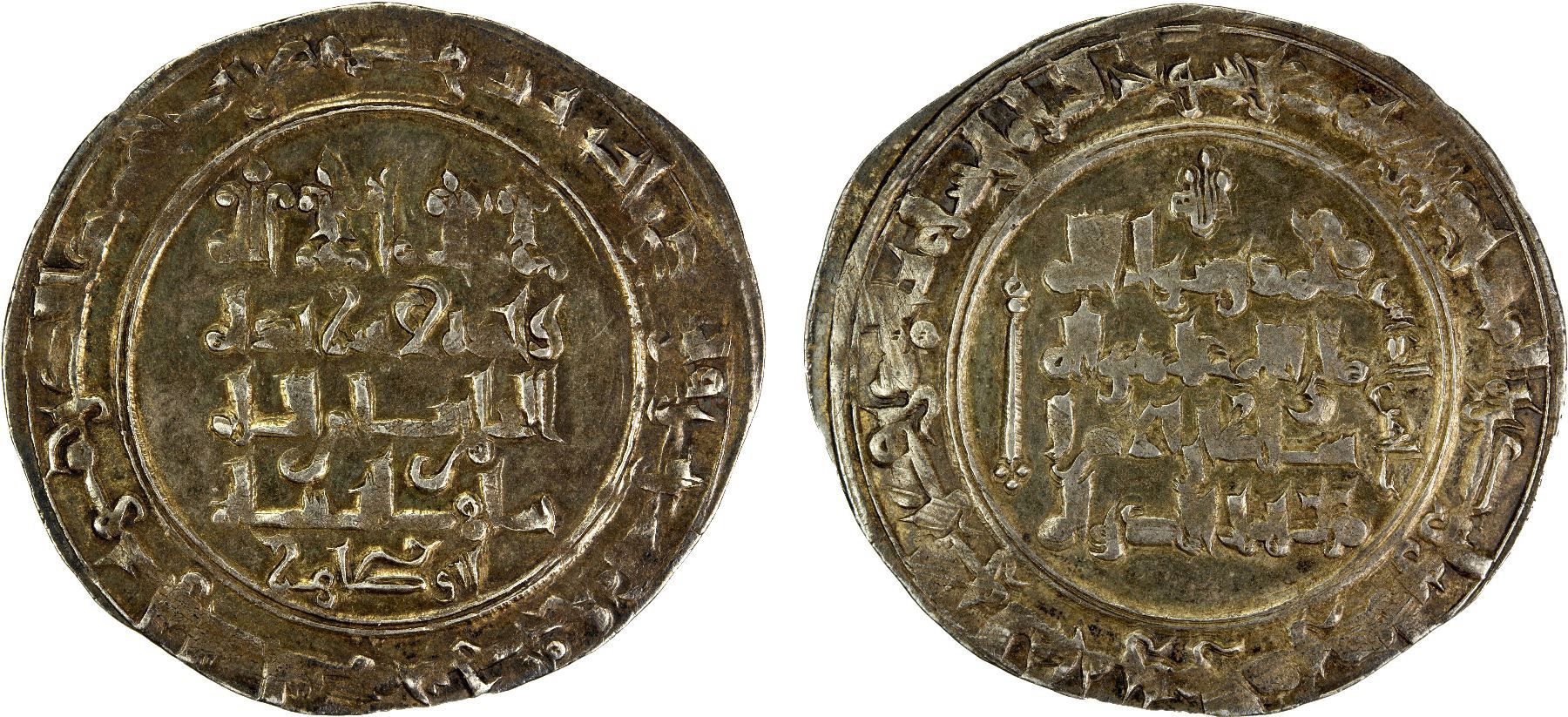
- Silver Dirham struck in Awāna near Dujail in 1036 A.D/427 AH bearing Qirwash's titles.

Emir of Mosul
- Reign: 1001–1050
- Predecessor: Al-Muqallad ibn al-Musayyab
- Successor: Baraka ibn al-Muqallad
- Died: 27 October 1052
- Dynasty: Uqaylid
- Father: Al-Muqallad ibn al-Musayyab

Qirwash ibn al-Muqallad (Arabic: قرواش بن المقلد, romanized: Qirwāsh ibn al-Muqallad), also known by the honorific Muʿtamid al-Dawla (Arabic: معتمد الدولة, lit. 'Trusted of the State'), was the third Uqaylid emir of Mosul, and ruler of other towns in Iraq, from 1001 to 1050. An ambitious ruler, like the other petty rulers of the region he was engaged in a constant struggle of shifting alliances and enmities to keep and extend his domains. This involved his nominal overlords the Buyid emirs of Baghdad, other Bedouin tribes, local warlords and administrators, and even members of his own tribe and family who begrudged his position. In 1010, Qirwash even briefly defected from the Abbasid allegiance and recognized the Fatimid Caliphate in Cairo instead. He was eventually defeated, imprisoned and deposed by his brother, Baraka, and died on 27 October 1052.

== Life ==
=== Clashes with the Buyids ===
Qirwash was the oldest son of al-Muqallad ibn al-Musayyab, the Emir of Mosul, who was assassinated in 1001, while plotting to seize Baghdad from the Buyids. During his brief reign (996–1001), al-Muqallad had managed to take over a number of towns in Iraq, including Anbar and Tikrit, and other settlements almost to the gates of Baghdad.

The Uqaylid institutions were tribal, depending on the Bedouin for military support rather than a salaried, standing army. As a result, al-Muqallad's unexpected death threw the loose tribal confederation into turmoil, as Qirwash and his uncle, al-Hasan, both claimed the tribe's leadership. The two were soon forced to come to a compromise, however, and make common cause against the claims of another tribesman, Qarrad ibn Ladid. As a result, the revenue of Mosul was split between them, while Qirwash inherited his father's rule over Kufa. There he had to force out the Khafaja tribe that had taken control of the city, and drive them into the Syrian Desert.

In 1002, Qirwash allied with the Banu Asad tribe against the Buyids, and moved to capture al-Mada'in. The Buyid army moved against the allies, but was defeated near Kufa on 22 July 1002. The Buyid commander al-Hajjaj ibn Ustadh Hurmuz then called upon the Khafaja and the Kurdish Annazids for assistance, and this time scored a major victory at Baziqiya. The Uqaylid–Asadid alliance broke, and the two armies were defeated again separately. The women of the Khafaja were able to loot the Uqayl camp in the aftermath, a major humiliation according to traditional Bedouin mores. Even worse, al-Hajjaj's politically astute brother, al-Hasan, was appointed governor of Iraq, and soon adopted a divide and rule approach that left the Uqaylids isolated: the Banu Asad were conciliated and their leader, Ali ibn Mazyad, given the position Qirwash had held, while the Khafaja likely received back control of Kufa.

The revival of Buyid fortunes left Qirwash trying to reassert control over the towns his father had claimed in Iraq. The most the Uqaylids could achieve during the next years were raids and kidnappings. The situation changed when the Khafaja joined the uprising of Abu'l-Abbas ibn Wasil in Basra. To counter them, in 1005/6 the Buyids again assigned Kufa to Qirwash. Not only that, but Qirwash visited Baghdad, where Caliph al-Qadir awarded him the title Muʿtamid al-Dawla (lit. 'Support of the Dynasty') and confirmed him in the leadership of the Bedouin and all rights held by Muqallad. At the same time, the death of the last of Qirwash's uncles in 1006/7, left him the undisputed leader of his tribe. His campaign against Kufa in 1006/7 failed, and the Buyids were forced to a rapprochement with Ibn Mazyad, but Qirwash was still able to extend his influence in Iraq. In 1008/9, the Uqaylids even seized Rahba from its pro-Fatimid governor, the Khafaji leader Abu Ali ibn Thimal.

=== Brief defection to the Fatimids ===
It was this complex political situation that drove Qirwash to switch his allegiance from the Sunni al-Qadir, a puppet of the Buyids, to the Shi'a Fatimid caliph of Cairo, al-Hakim bi-Amr Allah. On 18 August 1010, Qirwash had the Friday sermon read in the name of al-Hakim in Mosul, followed on 14 October by Anbar, and on 21 October in Anbar and al-Mada'in.

Whether meant as a genuine shift in allegiance, or merely as an assertion of his independence, this move backfired. The Buyids mobilized money and men against him under al-Hasan ibn Ustadh Hurmuz, and even before the gifts sent from Cairo arrived, Qirwash had returned to the Abbasid allegiance. The whole affair left his position in Iraq severely weakened. At the same time, this episode resulted in the proclamation of al-Qadir's anti-Fatimid Baghdad Manifesto.

=== Under Sultan al-Dawla and Musharrif al-Dawla ===
The Buyid chief emir Baha al-Dawla died in December 1012, and was succeeded by his son Sultan al-Dawla. Faced with opposition to his rule by powerful local warlords and the Bedouin tribes, he allied with Qirwash, taking his sister (or daughter) Jibara as wife. With their backing, he was able to take control of Baghdad itself, neutralize the other Bedouin tribes and finally subdue the Iraqi marshlands, that had been autonomous for decades, to the authority of Baghdad.

Nevertheless, the decline of Buyid power was evident during this time, not least due to the infighting of the Buyid emirs. This further destabilized the political situation in Iraq, as various Arab and Kurdish groups felt free to pursue their own aims against their local rivals. Thus in 1018, Ibn Mazyad's grandson Dubays allied with the Uqaylid sheikh of Samarra, Gharib ibn Maqan, against the latter's cousin, Rafi ibn al-Husayn. The Buyids joined the former, while Qirwash assisted Rafi, hoping thus to extend his own influence over central Iraq. As a result, in 1020, the Banu Asad together with the Buyid troops defeated Qirwash, who was taken prisoner. Rafi immediately joined Gharib and, with Buyid assistance, captured Tikrit. Qirwash was able to escape and sought the assistance of the Khafaja, only to be defeated again by Buyid troops west of the Euphrates. Qirwash was able to quickly reconcile himself with the Buyids, however, possibly aided by the replacement of Sultan al-Dawla by his younger brother, Musharrif al-Dawla, in March 1021.

Musharrif al-Dawla maintained good relations with the Uqaylids, but after his unexpected death in 1025, the struggle between the Buyid emirs Jalal al-Dawla and Abu Kalijar again destabilized the political situation in Iraq.

=== Under Jalal al-Dawla ===
In 1024, the Buyid vizier, Abu'l-Qasim al-Husayn ibn Ali al-Maghribi, fled Baghdad and entered Qirwash's service, but was expelled in 1026 on the insistence of the Abbasid caliph, al-Qadir. In 1026/7, the Khafaja invaded Uqaylid lands in central Iraq, and allied with the Banu Asad and the Buyids. Qirwash's vanguard was defeated near Kufa, forcing the Uqaylid emir to flee, while the allies occupied Anbar.

Qirwash was also confronted by a league of Uqaylid rivals: Abu Mansur Kamil—a son of Qarrad ibn Ladid, who had tried to take over the rule of the Uqayl when Qirwash's father died, and Qirwash's deputy in the town of Sindiya—Rafi ibn al-Husayn of Tikrit, and his own brother and governor of Nisibis, Badran. During the battle between the two armies, a reconciliation was achieved, allowing Badran to retain Nisibis. In the meantime, the Khafaja and Asad had fallen out, as the former had plundered the town of al-Jami'yan, held by the latter. The Asad concluded a peace with Qirwash, who helped the inhabitants of Anbar to refortify their town. At the same time the Khafaja leader, Mani ibn al-Hasan, submitted to the Buyids. While Qirwash in the end managed to retain Anbar, these events spelled the definite end of Uqaylid rule in the territories south of Baghdad.

In the contest between Jalal al-Dawla and Abu Kalijar, Qirwash initially supported the latter, even launching an abortive attack on Baghdad in 1029/30. When Jalal al-Dawla established himself in Baghdad, however, Qirwash accommodated himself to the new situation and during the 1030s supported the Buyid emir politically and militarily. Thus, in 1036 Qirwash took custody of the former Buyid vizier, Ibn Makula, and kept him imprisoned until he ordered him strangled in February 1039. In 1036/7, Qirwash helped Jalal al-Dawla against the mutiny of the Turk Barstoghan.

In 1040, Qirwash tried to seize Tikrit back from the successors of Rafi ibn al-Husayn. The latter bribed Jalal al-Dawla with a large sum into attacking the Uqaylid emir's possessions, Sindiya and Anbar, forcing Qirwash to back down and recognize the loss of Tikrit. At the same time, Iraq faced the first attacks by the Oghuz Turks. On 21 April 1044, Qirwash, leading the Uqaylids and allied with Dubays, inflicted a heavy defeat on the Turks at Ra's al-Ayil, driving them back to Adharbayjan.

=== Downfall and death ===
By 1048/9, another rival had emerged, his brother Abu Kamil Baraka. Qirwash was supported by Quraysh, the son of Badran, who forced Baraka to flee, but in June 1049 the armies of the two brothers clashed openly, and several of Qirwash's followers defected. Baraka captured Qirwash and brought him to Mosul. For a while, Qirwash remained the nominal emir of the Uqaylids, but de facto rule passed to Baraka, who imprisoned Qirwash in 1050.

When Baraka died in 1052, he was succeeded by Badran's son, Quraysh. Shortly after, on 27 October 1052, Qirwash died at the fortress of al-Jarrahiya; according to at least one report, assassinated at his nephew's orders.

== Sources ==
- Bosworth, C. E. (2000). "ʿUḳaylids". In Bearman, P. J.; Bianquis, Th.; Bosworth, C. E.; van Donzel, E. & Heinrichs, W. P. (eds.). The Encyclopaedia of Islam, Second Edition. Volume X: T–U. Leiden: E. J. Brill. pp. 786–787. doi:10.1163/1573-3912_islam_COM_1274. ISBN 978-90-04-11211-7.
- Busse, Heribert (2004) [1969]. Chalif und Grosskönig - Die Buyiden im Irak (945-1055) [Caliph and Great King - The Buyids in Iraq (945-1055)] (in German). Würzburg: Ergon Verlag. ISBN 3-89913-005-7.
- Donohue, John J. (2003). The Buwayhid Dynasty in Iraq 334 H./945 to 403 H./1012: Shaping Institutions for the Future. Leiden and Boston: Brill. ISBN 90-04-12860-3.
- Kennedy, Hugh (2004) [1986]. The Prophet and the Age of the Caliphates: The Islamic Near East from the 6th to the 11th Century (Second ed.). Harlow: Longman. ISBN 978-0-582-40525-7.
- Zetterstéen, K. V. (1927). "Ḳarwās̲h̲". The Encyclopaedia of Islam, Volume II: E–K. Leiden and London: E. J. Brill. pp. 781–782. doi:10.1163/2214-871X_ei1_SIM_3957.

Preceded by Al-Muqallad ibn al-Musayyab	Emir of Mosul; 1001–1050	Succeeded by Baraka ibn al-Muqallad
