= Abu Taghlib =

Emir of Mosul from 967 to 978

Abu Taghlib; أبو تغلب

Emir of Mosul
- Reign: 967–978
- Predecessor: Nasir al-Dawla
- Born: 940
- Died: 29 August 979 (aged 38–39); Ramla, Fatimid Caliphate
- Uddat al-Dawla Abu Taghlib Fadl Allah al-Ghadanfar al-Hamdani
- Dynasty: Hamdanid
- Father: Nasir al-Dawla
- Mother: Fatima bint Ahmad

Uddat al-Dawla Abu Taghlib Fadl Allah al-Ghadanfar al-Hamdani (Arabic: عدة الدولة أبو تغلب فضل الله الغضنفر الحمداني, romanized: ʿUddat al-Dawla ʿAbū Taghlib Faḍl Allāh al-Ghaḍanfar al-Ḥamdanī), usually known simply by his kunya as Abu Taghlib, was the third Hamdanid ruler of the Emirate of Mosul, encompassing most of the Jazira.

His reign was troubled, being marked by conflicts with some of his brothers, antagonism with the various branches of the Buyids for influence in Baghdad, attacks by the Byzantine Empire under John I Tzimiskes, and his involvement in the rebellion of the Byzantine general Bardas Skleros. His relations with the Buyid emir of Iraq, Izz al-Dawla Bakhtiyar, alternated between friendly and confrontational, but the two later concluded an alliance, especially as Bakhtiyar faced challenges to his own rule. In 978, the Jazira was occupied by the Buyids of Shiraz under Bakhtiyar's cousin Adud al-Dawla, and Abu Taghlib fled to the Fatimid-controlled parts of Syria. There he tried to secure the governorship of Damascus, and became involved in local rivalries which resulted in his defeat in battle and execution on 29 August 979.

== Life ==
=== Origin and background ===
Family tree of the Hamdanid dynasty

Abu Taghlib was born in 940 as the eldest son of the Hamdanid al-Hasan, better known by his laqab (honorific title) of Nasir al-Dawla. His mother was a Kurdish woman, Fatima bint Ahmad, who reportedly exercised considerable influence over Nasir al-Dawla's affairs.

Nasir al-Dawla had established the Hamdanids as masters of a practically independent emirate encompassing the Jazira and centred on Mosul. Nasir al-Dawla engaged in repeated attempts to gain control over the Abbasid caliphs at Baghdad, but in the end was forced to concede defeat to the more powerful Buyid dynasty, recognize their suzerainty and pay them tribute. At the same time, Nasir al-Dawla's younger brother Ali, better known as Sayf al-Dawla, managed to establish his control over northern Syria from his two capitals Aleppo and Mayyafariqin, and through his clashes with the Byzantine Empire quickly overshadowed his brother. However, the last decade of Sayf al-Dawla's rule, until his death in February 967, was marked by heavy military defeats at the hands of the Byzantines, who occupied much of his domains, and internal turmoil.

It was in this context that Abu Taghlib is first mentioned in 964, when his father had once again been embroiled in a conflict with the Buyids. The army of the Buyid Mu'izz al-Dawla occupied Mosul and Nasir al-Dawla was once again forced to flee to the hill country of the northern Jazira. Abu Taghlib led the resistance against the Buyids, who, unable to maintain themselves there, evacuated Mosul and reached a new agreement with the Hamdanids. Abu Taghlib, with the tacit consent of almost all his brothers, deposed his elderly father in May 967 and imprisoned him in the fortress of Ardamusht, where he died in February 969.

=== Reign ===
Map of the Jazira (Upper Mesopotamia), the homeland and main power base of the Hamdanids

==== Rebellion of Abu'l-Muzzafar Hamdan ====
Abu Taghlib, surnamed al-Ghadanfar ('The Lion'), succeeded his father as emir and head of the Jaziran branch of the Hamdanid family, but almost immediately his authority was contested by his younger half-brother, Abu'l-Muzzafar Hamdan, who had not consented to their father's deposition. Nasir al-Dawla may have intended to make Ahmad his heir, and had given him governance of Nisibis, Maridin and Rahba, while Hamdan also seized control of Raqqa from the family's Syrian branch after the death of Sayf al-Dawla. Abu Taghlib thus turned to the new Buyid emir of Iraq, Izz al-Dawla Bakhtiyar, for assistance: unlike his father, Abu Taghlib had no prior claims on Iraq, and the Buyid ruler likewise was too preoccupied for the moment with securing his rule there to threaten Hamdanid rule over the Jazira.

With Buyid aid, Abu Taghlib forced his half-brother to hand over Raqqa and Rahba, but Hamdan managed to persuade Bakhtiyar to switch sides. Rahba was lost to Hamdan, and Abu Taghlib's other brothers now began switching their allegiance. Nevertheless, Abu Taghlib prevailed, forcing Hamdan to flee to Baghdad as he advanced and captured Sinjar. Abu Taghlib seized not only the towns held by his brother, but also used the conditions of near-anarchy prevailing in Syria at the time and after Sayf al-Dawla's death to expand his territory at the expense of his cousin, Sa'd al-Dawla. By 971 he had extended his control over all of Diyar Bakr and Diyar Mudar, once part of Sayf al-Dawla's domain, uniting the entire Jazira under his rule. Caliph al-Muti even granted Abu Taghlib suzerainty over the Hamdanid emirate of Aleppo. Sa'd al-Dawla, deprived of his own capital and lacking any power to offer any resistance, tacitly accepted these losses as well as his cousin's suzerainty. As ruler of the Jazira, Abu Taghlib was one of the richest rulers of the region; Ibn Hawkal's descriptions attest to the wealth derived from the many Hamdanid estates, and Ibn Miskawayh, who was tasked with inventorying the family's mountain strongholds after the Buyid dissolution of the Hamdanid emirate in 979, writes of the immense cash reserves stored there.

==== Conflict and settlement with Bakhtiyar ====
With his position secure, Abu Taghlib is said to have dreamed of reclaiming his father's place as amir al-umara ('chief emir') and master of Baghdad and the caliph; while Hamdan incited Bakhtiyar against Abu Taghlib. The conflict was averted for a time, possibly due to the eruption of the Fatimid Caliphate into the affairs of Syria, which united both rulers in opposition to the Fatimid invasion: both Mosul and Baghdad even sponsored the campaigns of the Qarmatian leader al-Hasan al-A'sam against the Fatimids. As part of this alliance, Abu Taghlib married a daughter of the Buyid ruler.

In 973, Hamdan finally persuaded Bakhtiyar to march north. Abu Taghlib evacuated Mosul without a fight, but with his army outflanked the Buyid emir and briefly threatened Baghdad. Negotiations resulted in an agreement, but Bakhtiyar regarded it as too favourable to the Hamdanid emir, and once more marched against Mosul. Nevertheless, no clashes are recorded and the conflict ended in a negotiated settlement in 974 that included in its provisions the award of the laqab of Uddat al-Dawla ('Instrument of the Dynasty') to Abu Taghlib by the caliph, and the payment of tribute by Abu Taghlib to Bakhtiyar.

==== Relations with the Byzantine Empire ====
During the same period, Abu Taghlib also faced the attacks of the Byzantines, who under Emperor John I Tzimiskes penetrated deep into the Jazira in 972. The devastating raid was partly avenged through the defeat and capture of the Domestic of the Schools Melias at Amid in 973, but in 974 Tzimiskes himself raided the Jazira in retaliation. Following the Byzantine attacks, Abu Taghlib paid tribute to the emperor for some time.

In 976, following the death of Tzimiskes, Abu Taghlib agreed to support the bid for the Byzantine throne of the rebel general Bardas Skleros, with whom he concluded a treaty whereby the Hamdanid ruler supplied Skleros with light cavalry in exchange for an unspecified marriage agreement.

==== Alliance with Bakhtiyar against Adud al-Dawla ====
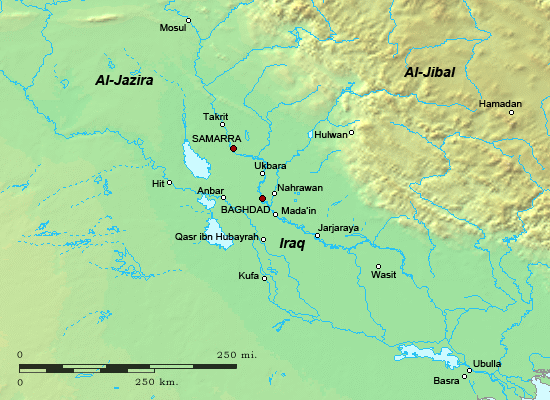
Map of Iraq in the 9th–10th centuries

In 973–975, Abu Taghlib supported Bakhtiyar in his own struggles to safeguard his power. Thus he once again marched on Baghdad during the rebellion of the Turkish military commander, Sabuktakin, although it was the intervention of the Buyid emir of Shiraz, Adud al-Dawla, that decided the conflict for Bakhtiyar. As a result of his assistance, in 975 Abu Taghlib secured a revision of the earlier treaty which freed him from the payment of tribute.

In November 977, Bakhtiyar found himself driven from Baghdad by his ambitious cousin, Adud al-Dawla. Once again, Hamdan persuaded him to march on Mosul, and Bakhtiyar led his forces to Tikrit. Abu Taghlib forestalled an attack by promising to support him against Adud al-Dawla, in exchange for the handing over of Hamdan, who was promptly executed. Although this secured Abu Taghlib's position, it also brought him to the attention of Adud al-Dawla. In May 978, Bakhtiyar and Abu Taghlib were defeated in a battle near Samarra by Adud al-Dawla. Bakhtiyar himself was captured and executed at the orders of his cousin, who then advanced on Mosul. Unlike earlier Buyid expeditions against the Hamdanids, that had failed chiefly because they were unable to sustain themselves in the Jazira, this was far better organized, as Adud al-Dawla brought along experienced administrators familiar with the area.

Adud al-Dawla took Mosul in June 978. Pursued by the Buyids, and with Adud al-Dawla refusing any negotiation, Abu Taghlib fled to Nisibis, Mayyafariqin, and thence to the mountains, possibly intending to seek refuge in Ardumusht. While the Buyids laid siege to Mayyafariqin, Abu Taghlib crossed into Byzantine territory held by Skleros, hoping to gain the latter's support. He defeated a Buyid force pursuing him at Skleros' base of Kharput/Hisn Ziyad in August, but Skleros too was hard-pressed by the loyalist general Bardas Phokas to assist him. Following the fall of Mayyafariqin to the Buyids, Abu Taghlib sought refuge with his sister Jamila in Rahba. His renewed offers for a negotiated settlement were rebuffed by Adud al-Dawla, as the Buyid ruler completed his conquest of the Jazira. Abu Taghlib's brothers Abu Abdallah Husayn and Abu Tahir Ibrahim even took service with the Buyids.

=== Exile and death ===
Only the Diyar Mudar remained under Abu Taghlib's control, but his situation was increasingly desperate. With Buyid control over most of the Jazira solidified, Skleros's revolt ending in defeat in March 979, and unable to seek aid from his cousin Sa'd al-Dawla, who had already acknowledged Adud al-Dawla's suzerainty and was under orders to arrest him, Abu Taghlib with his remaining followers crossed the Syrian Desert to the Fatimid-controlled south of Syria. There he became embroiled in the complex power struggles between the Fatimid government and local elites. He endeavoured to gain recognition by the Fatimids as governor of Damascus, but the rebel general al-Qassam, who held the city, repulsed him. Under attack by the Damascenes, and with members of his family starting to desert him, Abu Taghlib moved further south to the region of Lake Tiberias. Abu Taghlib's ambitions and his contacts with the Fatimids now came to threaten the position of Mufarrij ibn Daghfal ibn al-Jarrah, a Tayy chief and ruler of Ramla. Hoping to sow dissension among the Arab tribes of the area and strengthen Fatimid authority, the Fatimid general Fadl now promised Ramla to Abu Taghlib, who openly allied himself with Mufarrij's rivals, the Banu Uqayl, and attacked Ramla in August 979. Fadl's troops, however, came to the aid of Mufarrij, and in the ensuing battle on 29 August Abu Taghlib was taken captive and executed. This was likely done at the behest of Adud al-Dawla, whom Mufarrij had previously recognized as his overlord.

The Jazira remained under Buyid control until 989, when Abu Taghlib's brothers Abu Abdallah Husayn and Abu Tahir Ibrahim, who had submitted to the Buyids, were installed as governors to oppose the marauding Kurdish chieftain Badh ibn Dustak. In this fight, the two brothers relied upon the Uqaylis; after the defeat of Badh, the Banu Uqayl turned on the Hamdanids and deposed and killed Abu Tahir Ibrahim, establishing the Uqaylid Dynasty as the rulers of the Jazira.

== Sources ==
- Canard, Marius (1971). "Ḥamdānids". In Lewis, B.; Ménage, V. L.; Pellat, Ch. & Schacht, J. (eds.). The Encyclopaedia of Islam, Second Edition. Volume III: H–Iram. Leiden: E. J. Brill. pp. 126–131. OCLC 495469525.
- Canard, Marius (2004). "Abū Tag̲h̲lib". In Bearman, P. J.; Bianquis, Th.; Bosworth, C. E.; van Donzel, E. & Heinrichs, W. P. (eds.). The Encyclopaedia of Islam, Second Edition. Volume XII: Supplement. Leiden: E. J. Brill. pp. 36–37. ISBN 978-90-04-13974-9.
- El-Azhari, Taef (2019). Queens, Eunuchs and Concubines in Islamic History, 661-1257. Edinburgh: Edinburgh University Press. ISBN 978-1-4744-2318-2.
- Gil, Moshe (1997) [1983]. A History of Palestine, 634–1099. Translated by Ethel Broido. Cambridge: Cambridge University Press. ISBN 0-521-59984-9.
- Holmes, Catherine (2005). Basil II and the Governance of Empire (976–1025). Oxford: Oxford University Press. ISBN 978-0-19-927968-5.
- Kennedy, Hugh (2004) [1986]. The Prophet and the Age of the Caliphates: The Islamic Near East from the 6th to the 11th Century (Second ed.). Harlow: Longman. ISBN 978-0-582-40525-7.
- Kraemer, Joel L. (1992). Humanism in the Renaissance of Islam: The Cultural Revival During the Buyid Age (2nd Revised ed.). Leiden: BRILL. ISBN 90-04-09736-8.

Preceded by Nasir al-Dawla	Emir of Mosul; 967–978	Vacant Buyid occupation Title next held by Abu Tahir Ibrahim and Abu Abdallah al-Husayn
