= Al-Muqallad ibn al-Musayyab =

Husam al-Dawla

Emir of Mosul
- Reign: 996–1001
- Predecessor: Abu Ja'far al-Hajjaj
- Successor: Qirwash ibn al-Muqallad
- Died: 22 January 1001; Anbar, Abbasid Caliphate
Names
- Husam al-Dawla Abu Hassan al-Muqallad ibn al-Musayyab
- Dynasty: Uqaylid
- Father: Al-Musayyab

Abu Hassān al-Muqallad ibn al-Musayyab (Arabic: أبو حَسّان المُقَلَّدُ بنُ المُسَيَّب, romanized: Abū Ḥassān al-Muqallad ibn al-Musayyab), known with the honorific Husam al-Dawla (Arabic: حسام الدولة, romanized: Ḥusām al-Dawla, lit. 'Sword of the State'), was an Uqaylid chieftain. He succeeded his older brother, Muhammad, as ruler of Mosul, succeeding in expelling the Buyid governor from the city. His attempts to create a centralized state failed, however, as he had to share power with his older brother Ali, and respect the tribal customs of the Uqayl tribe. His ambitions led him to turn south, towards Buyid-held Iraq, where he came to control a number of towns around Baghdad, including Kufa. In late 1000, he entered into negotiations for the capture of Baghdad, but was assassinated on 22 January 1001.

== Origin ==
Al-Muqallad and the Uqaylids belonged to the Banu Uqayl, a northern Arab tribe. His brother Muhammad began the rise of the Uqaylids to power by exploiting the Kurdish raids into Upper Mesopotamia, and the weakness of the last Hamdanid rulers of Mosul that forced them to turn to the Uqayl for military assistance. In the process, he seized several towns in Upper Mesopotamia, culminating in the capture of Mosul itself in c. 990, which he then ruled as the nominal vassal of the Buyid emirs of Iraq.

== Succession disputes ==
When Muhammad died in 996, al-Muqallad and his older brother Ali fought over the succession. According to tribal custom, Ali, as the eldest, should have succeeded their father, and consequently he was also supported by the majority of the Uqayl tribe. Al-Muqallad turned to the Buyid emir Baha al-Dawla for support, promising an annual tribute in exchange. At the same time, he persuaded Ali to assist him in capturing Mosul, claiming that Baha al-Dawla had appointed him governor there. The two brothers successfully took Mosul from its Buyid governor, Abu Ja'far al-Hajjaj, and agreed to rule it jointly. Al-Muqallad's agent in Baghdad was unable to prevent an open conflict with the Buyids, but it was soon settled against the payment of 10,000 gold dinars. Al-Muqallad received the honorific title Ḥusām al-Dawla (lit. 'Sword of the Dynasty'), the title of leader (zaʿīm) of the Arab tribes, and the tax farms of Mosul, Kufa, Qasr (possibly Qasr Ibn Hubayra), and al-Jami'ayn.

While al-Muqallad remained in charge of Mosul and began recruiting a military force composed of Turks and Daylamites, Ali lived as a traditional bedouin chieftain among the Uqayl tribesmen. Soon, however, the rift between Ali and al-Muqallad re-emerged. As the historian Hugh N. Kennedy remarks, the two men represented two different worlds and concepts of government. While Ali "stood for traditional bedouin leadership and relied on the military power of the tribe", al-Muqallad, with his contacts with the Buyid court and its military system based on Turkish ghilmān and Daylamite troops, pursued a centralized government "very much in the Hamdanid mould".

The conflict between the two brothers erupted in early 997. Despite lavish gifts, al-Muqallad was unable to secure the backing of more than 2,000 Uqayl tribesmen, while 10,000 flocked to Ali's cause instead. However, the clash was avoided through the intercession of their sister, Rahila, who "in a very traditional gesture, had threatened to shame herself in front of the whole tribe" unless they came to terms, as Kennedy writes. The brothers reconciled, and Ali was released and restored to his domains. Al-Muqallad then turned on his brothers' erstwhile ally, the ruler of Wasit, Ali ibn Mazyad, but his campaign was cut short after being informed that Ali planned to seize Mosul in his absence. Through the mediation of Hasan, again the brothers reconciled, and Ali was named as deputy of al-Muqallad for Mosul during the latter's absences from the city. The compromise between al-Muqallad and Ali had far-reaching consequences for the Uqaylid emirate. It ensured that the Uqayl tribesmen, rather than a standing force of professional troops, would be the backbone of the dynasty throughout its existence.

== Intrigues in Iraq and death ==
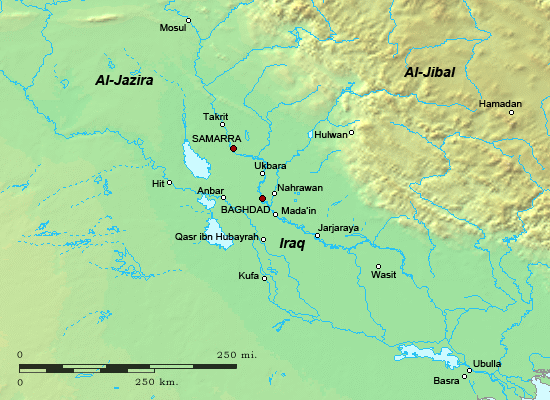
Map of the region of Iraq in the Abbasid period

Al-Muqallad himself devoted most of his attention to his interests in Iraq, where he quickly managed to take over control of Anbar and Tikrit, as well as the settlement of al-Sindiya, located almost at the gates of Baghdad. In Kufa, al-Muqallad replaced the hitherto ruling Khafaja emir Ulyan ibn Thimal. Evidently the appointment was part of a Buyid strategy to counter the threat of the Khafaja with the Uqaylids, but al-Muqallad managed to maintain good relations with the Khafaja, and even enlisted him in his own campaigns. At the same time, by virtue of his expansion into Iraq came into conflict with another Arab tribe, the Banu Asad, under Ali ibn Mazyad, who raided the Uqaylid territories.

In 997–998, al-Muqallad launched a campaign into the Kurdish areas to the northwest, culminating in the capture of the towns of Daquqa and Khanijar in September/October 1000. At about the same time, in 999/1000, Ali died, and was succeeded by a younger brother, al-Hasan. With assistance from the Khafaja, al-Muqallad expelled Hasan from Mosul, securing sole control of the city for himself.

Boosted by his successes, al-Muqallad set his sights on capturing Baghdad itself. It was during negotiations with the Buyids' army commanders that he fell victim to assassination by one of his own Turkish slave-soldiers at Anbar on 22 January 1001.

Due to the loose tribal structure of the Uqaylid regime, his power base quickly crumbled, allowing the Buyids to recover. Al-Muqallad was succeeded by his son, Qirwash, but not before yet another succession struggle between Qirwash and his uncle, Hasan, was resolved via compromise. Qirwash would spend the next few years in trying to keep his father's acquisitions across Iraq.

== Sources ==
- Bosworth, C. E. (2000). "ʿUḳaylids". In Bearman, P. J.; Bianquis, Th.; Bosworth, C. E.; van Donzel, E. & Heinrichs, W. P. (eds.). The Encyclopaedia of Islam, Second Edition. Volume X: T–U. Leiden: E. J. Brill. pp. 786–787. doi:10.1163/1573-3912_islam_COM_1274. ISBN 978-90-04-11211-7.
- Busse, Heribert (2004) [1969]. Chalif und Grosskönig - Die Buyiden im Irak (945-1055) [Caliph and Great King - The Buyids in Iraq (945-1055)] (in German). Würzburg: Ergon Verlag. ISBN 3-89913-005-7.
- Kennedy, Hugh (2004) [1986]. The Prophet and the Age of the Caliphates: The Islamic Near East from the 6th to the 11th Century (Second ed.). Harlow: Longman. ISBN 978-0-582-40525-7.
- Zetterstéen, K. V. (1993). "al-Muḳallad". In Bosworth, C. E.; van Donzel, E.; Heinrichs, W. P. & Pellat, Ch. (eds.). The Encyclopaedia of Islam, Second Edition. Volume VII: Mif–Naz. Leiden: E. J. Brill. p. 497. doi:10.1163/1573-3912_islam_SIM_5455. ISBN 978-90-04-09419-2.

Preceded by Abu Ja'far al-Hajjaj as Buyid governor	Emir of Mosul; 996–1001; With: Ali; Al-Hasan	Succeeded by Qirwash ibn al-Muqallad
