= Abu Tahir Ibrahim ibn Nasir al-Dawla =

Abu Tahir Ibrahim

Emir of Mosul
- Reign: 989–990
- Co-ruler: Abu Abdallah al-Husayn
Names
- Abu Tahir Ibrahim ibn Nasir al-Dawla
- Dynasty: Hamdanid
- Father: Nasir al-Dawla
- Religion: Twelver Shi'a Islam

Abu Tahir Ibrahim ibn Nasir al-Dawla was a Hamdanid prince, who along with his brother al-Husayn was the last Hamdanid ruler of Mosul in 989–990. After his defeat at the hand of the Marwanid Kurds, he was killed by the Uqaylid leader Muhammad ibn al-Musayyab, who usurped rule over Mosul for his family.

== Life ==
Family tree of the Hamdanid dynasty

Ibrahim was a younger son of the founder of the Hamdanid emirate of Mosul, Nasir al-Dawla (r. 935–967). Nasir al-Dawla was succeeded by his son Abu Taghlib, who had to confront an uprising by his half-brother Hamdan. Ibrahim apparently sided with Hamdan, for when the latter was defeated in 971 and fled to the Buyid court in Baghdad, Ibrahim joined him. Abu Taghlib's rivalry with the Buyids eventually led to the capture of Mosul by the Buyid Adud al-Dawla in 978, which forced Abu Taghlib to flee to Syria. Ibrahim, however, along with his brother al-Husayn, apparently submitted to the Buyids and entered their service, or were possibly kept as hostages in Baghdad.

During the 980s, Mosul was threatened by the Kurdish chieftain Badh ibn Dustak. Left without support from Baghdad, the local Buyid governor turned to the local Arab tribes of the Banu Uqayl and the Banu Numayr for assistance. This threatened Buyid control of the area as much as the Kurds, and in 989, the new Buyid emir, Baha al-Dawla, allowed the Hamdanid brothers to return to Mosul, in the hope that their local ties would mobilize opposition against Badh, and keep the Arab tribes reined in.

The Hamdanids were indeed received with enthusiasm by the local population, to such a degree that they rose in revolt and expelled the Buyid governor from Mosul. The Uqayl backed the Hamdanids, and received control of the towns of Jazirat ibn Umar, Nisibis, and Balad (north of Mosul), in exchange. Exploiting the turmoil, Badh attacked Mosul in the next year, but was defeated and killed by the numerically inferior Uqayl forces in battle near Balad. A Hamdanid counter-offensive followed in the region of Amida against Badh's successor, Abu Ali al-Hasan ibn Marwan, but failed to score any success. Indeed, al-Husayn was taken prisoner during the campaign, only to be released and seek refuge in the Fatimid Caliphate. Ibrahim fled with his son Ali to Uqaylid-held Nisibis, where Muhammad took them prisoner and killed them, usurping rule over Mosul and founding the Uqaylid dynasty.

== Sources ==
- Busse, Heribert (2004) [1969]. Chalif und Grosskönig - Die Buyiden im Irak (945-1055) [Caliph and Great King - The Buyids in Iraq (945-1055)] (in German). Würzburg: Ergon Verlag. ISBN 3-89913-005-7.
- Canard, Marius (1971). "Ḥamdānids". In Lewis, B.; Ménage, V. L.; Pellat, Ch. & Schacht, J. (eds.). The Encyclopaedia of Islam, Second Edition. Volume III: H–Iram. Leiden: E. J. Brill. pp. 126–131. OCLC 495469525.
- Kennedy, Hugh (2004) [1986]. The Prophet and the Age of the Caliphates: The Islamic Near East from the 6th to the 11th Century (Second ed.). Harlow: Longman. ISBN 978-0-582-40525-7.

| Vacant Buyid rule Title last held by Abu Taghlib | Emir of Mosul; 989–990; With: Abu Abdallah al-Husayn | Succeeded by Muhammad ibn al-Musayyab |
