= Sunni Revival =

1055–1258 period of Islamic political history

The Sunni Revival was a period in Islamic history marked by the revival of the political fortunes of Sunni Islam, a renewed interest in Sunni law and theology and the spread of new styles in art and architecture. Conventionally, the revival lasted from 1055 until 1258. The Ghaznavids, Ma'munids and Karakhanids were the founding powers of the Sunni Revival.

Richard Bulliet has proposed that the term "recentering" better describes the period than "revival" or "renaissance". The period is characterized as much by developments within Sunnism as by Sunni relations with Shia Islam. In particular, it was a period of homogenization of Sunnism as scholars and leaders strove for ijmāʿ (consensus). Eric Chaney has argued that the Sunni Revival led to the decline of scientific output in the Islamic world.

== Timing ==
The Sunni Revival followed a period of Shia ascendancy, sometimes called the "Shia Century", under the Fatimid dynasty in Africa, Palestine and parts of Arabia; the Hamdanid dynasty in Syria; and the Buyid dynasty in Iraq and Iran. During this period, Shia polities controlled most of the Islamic world, including its core areas. The Abbasid Caliph, the supreme Sunni leader, was under the control of the Buyids, who governed Baghdad, while the Sharif of Mecca was under the authority of the Fatimids.

During al-Qa'im's reign, the Abbasid Caliphate experienced a notable resurgence of authority, particularly within the territories in Iraq. Al-Qa'im strengthened his administration by selecting Abu'l-Qasim Ibn al-Muslima, known as "Ra'is al-Ru'asa" (Chief of Chiefs), as his vizier—a decisive leader with strong Sunni convictions. The intellectual foundations of the Sunni revival were already emerging through various developments: the establishment of madrasas across the region, the increasing acceptance of Ash'ari theological doctrine (though this gained full legitimacy only gradually), and the growing influence of Hanbali jurisprudence with its emphasis on traditional Islamic scholarship. The newly arrived Seljuk leadership provided strong support for these religious and educational initiatives. The religious revival began under the Abbasid caliph al-Qadir (r. 991–1031). Although subject to the Buyids and politically powerless, he managed to steer an increasingly independent course in religious issues. Backed by the Hanbali traditionalists, al-Qadir transformed the caliphate into the champion of Sunnism, condemning Shia and rationalist (Mu'tazilite) beliefs with which previous Abbasid caliphs had partially sympathized. The so-called "Qadiri Creed", formulated in 1018, was the first articulation of Sunni beliefs in their own right, rather than defined in opposition to the Shia.

The Sunni Revival became a political movement when the Sunni Seljuk Turks conquered Baghdad from the Buyids in 1055, saving Caliph al-Qa'im from being overthrown by the Shia. The period of Seljuk domination lasted roughly a century, until about 1150. They were definitively ousted from Baghdad in 1157. Thereafter a period of Abbasid resurgence and ecumenism followed until the Mongols sacked Baghdad in 1258.

== Spread ==
The chief architect of the political and legal Sunni revival was Nizam al-Mulk (d. 1092), vizier of the Seljuk Empire. He founded the school which took his name, the Nizamiyya of Baghdad. The chief architect of the theological revival, al-Ghazali (d. 1111), taught at Nizam's school in Baghdad. This was not the first madrasa, but it was by far the most influential and nizamiyya fashioned after that in Baghdad were founded wherever the Sunni revival spread. They were a major factor in the homogenization of Sunnism during the revival. Nizam al-Mulk sought to strengthen the Seljuk state while challenging the influence and ceremonial authority of the Fatimid rulers in Cairo. He promoted the Sunni revival throughout Iraq and Iran as part of this strategy. Historical accounts present him as a champion of religious orthodoxy who worked to restore governmental stability and religious order in Iran, addressing what he viewed as the destructive legacy of Buyid rule, which he characterized as both heretical and oppressive.

The figure most associated with the Sunni Revival in Syria is Nur ad-Din (d. 1174), who built twenty madrasas in Damascus. In 1171, Saladin, originally a general of Nur ad-Din, abolished the Fatimid Caliphate and brought Egypt into the Sunni fold. His Ayyubid dynasty vigorously strengthened Sunnism in Syria, Palestine and Egypt.
