= Siege of Mosul (1096) =

- Part of the Seljuk invasions
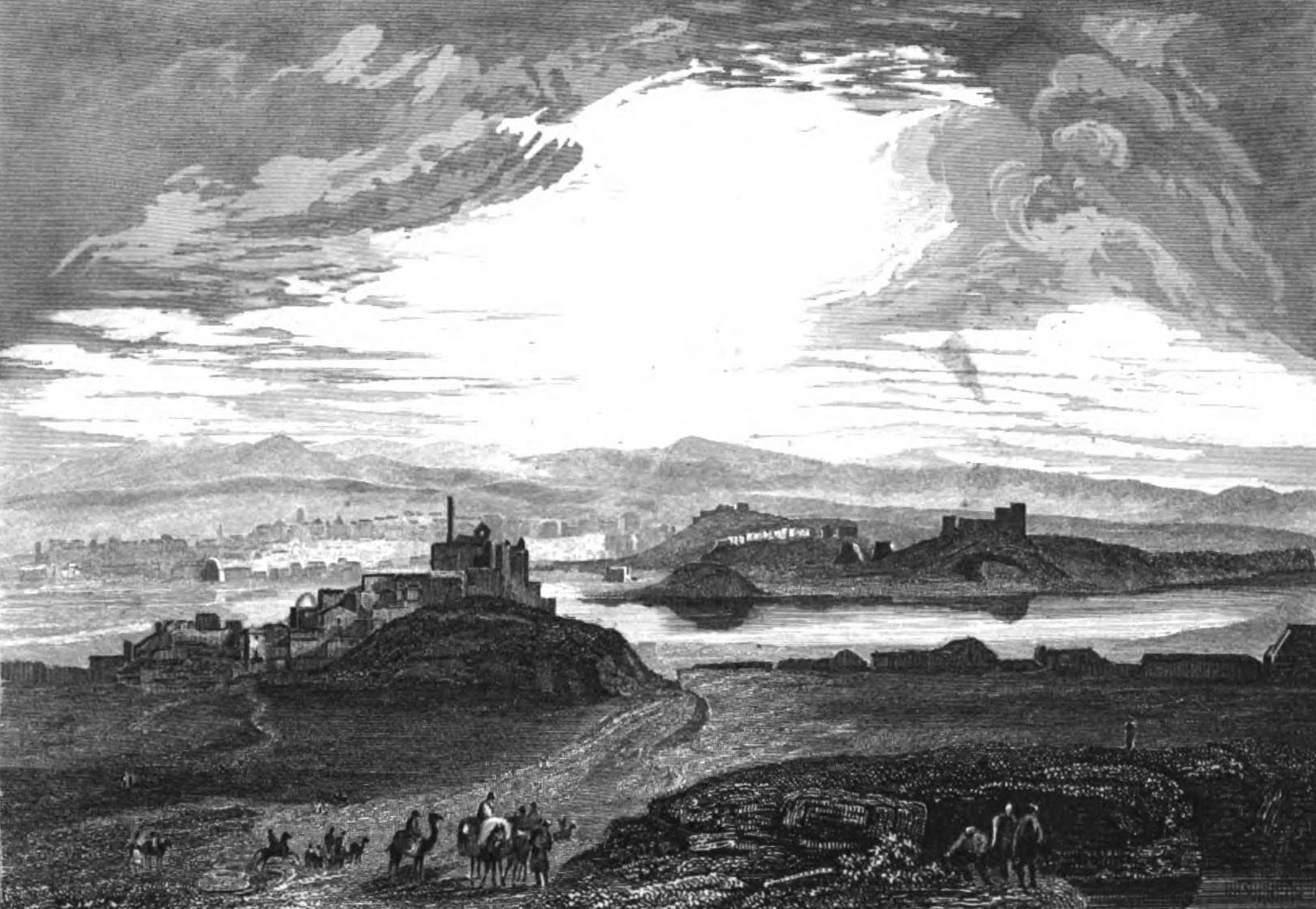
- Old drawing of Mosul: the Kasbah of the Euphrates Island and its most important city, which witnessed the establishment of the Uqaylid State and remained their capital until the collapse of the emirate in 1096.
Date	24 October 1096 (4 Dhu al-Qadah 489 AH)
Location	Mosul, Iraq 36.340000°N 43.130001°E
Result	Seljuk victory
Territorial changes	The Seljuks annexed the territory of the Uqaylid State.

Belligerents
Seljuk Empire	Uqaylid dynasty

Commanders and leaders
Kerbogha; Altuntaş	Ali bin Muslim; Jakarmash

The siege of Mosul (Arabic: حِصَارُ المَوصِل, romanized: Ḥiṣar al-Mawṣil) was a siege carried out by the Seljuks on the city of Mosul, the capital of the Uqaylid dynasty and the seat of its rule. They were able to storm the city in October 1096 AD after the intensification of the 9-months siege.

The incident ended with the collapse of the Uqaylid dynasty on Dhul-Qi'dah 4, 489 AH, after a rule that lasted more than 100 years.

== See also ==
- Uqaylid dynasty
- History of Iraq
