= Baghdad Manifesto =

Polemical tract (1011)

The Baghdad Manifesto (Arabic: بَيَان بَغْدَاد, Bayan Baghdād) was a polemical tract issued in 1011 on behalf of the Abbasid caliph al-Qadir against the rival Isma'ili Fatimid Caliphate, then ruled by al-Hakim.

== Background ==
The manifesto was the result of the steady expansion of the Fatimid Caliphate since its establishment in the early 10th century, and the continued activity of the pro-Fatimid Isma'ili missionary movement (da'wa) across the Middle East. In 401 AH (AD 1010/11), the da'wa scored a significant success when the Shi'a Uqaylids, who ruled Mosul, Mada'in, Kufa, and other towns close to the Abbasid capital of Baghdad, publicly recognized the suzerainty of the Fatimid caliph al-Hakim by having the khutba read in his name. They were soon followed by the Banu Asad tribe, also resident in Iraq.

This expansion of Fatimid influence to the very doorstep of Baghdad alarmed the Abbasid caliph al-Qadir, who launched a series of counter-moves. In the same year of the Islamic calendar, he successfully forced the Uqaylid ruler Qirwash to return to recognizing Abbasid suzerainty by threatening to attack him otherwise.

== Manifesto ==
He then called an assembly of leading Sunni and Twelver Shi'a scholars, including several esteemed Alids. The assembly issued a manifesto denouncing the Fatimids' claims of descent from Ali and the Ahl al-Bayt (the family of Muhammad) as false, and thus challenge the foundation of the Fatimid dynasty's claims to leadership in the Islamic world.

Based on the work of the earlier anti-Fatimid polemicists Ibn Rizam and Akhu Muhsin, the manifesto instead put forth an alternative genealogy of descent from a certain Daysan ibn Sa'id. The document was ordered read in mosques throughout the Abbasid territories, and al-Qadir commissioned a number of theologians to compose further anti-Fatimid tracts. The manifesto and its list of signatories were reproduced by multiple medieval sources and, during the early 20th century, due to the lack of sources that were not made available until later decades, it was used as a principal source on the origins and early history of the Fatimids.
