= Al-Ghalib =

11th-century Abbasid prince and Heir-apparent

Al-Ghalib الغالب

Heir apparent of the Abbasid Caliphate
- Tenure: 1001–1019
- Born: 992; Baghdad
- Died: 1019; Baghdad
- Burial: Baghdad
Names
- Abu'l-Fadl Muhammad ibn al-Qadir
- Dynasty: Abbasid
- Father: al-Qadir
- Religion: Sunni Islam

Abu'l-Fadl Muhammad ibn al-Qadir (Arabic: أبو الفضل محمد بن القادر) better known by his regnal name al-Ghalib bi'llah (Arabic: الغالب بالله), was an Abbasid prince, son of caliph al-Qadir. He was nominated heir in 1001, however he died before his father.

== Biography ==
Muhammad was born in December 992, and was the oldest son of Caliph al-Qadir (r. 991–1031). Muhammad, then only eight or nine years old, was proclaimed as heir apparent, with the title of al-Ghalib Bi'llah, in 1001. This nomination was a response to pretenders to the caliphate from other branches of the Abbasid dynasty; in Transoxiana, a distant cousin, Abdallah ibn Uthman, a descendant of the 9th-century caliph al-Wathiq, pretended to be al-Qadir's designated heir and won the support of the local Karakhanid ruler. This event provided al-Qadir with the occasion to formally proclaim his son as heir without waiting for approval by his Buyid overlords. The Karakhanids soon recognized the Abbasid caliph's suzerainty for the first time, and dropped their support of the pretender.

However, al-Ghalib died in January 1019, while his father was still alive. In 1030, al-Qadir named another son, Abu Ja'far, the future al-Qa'im, as his heir, a decision taken completely independently of the Buyid emirs who ruled over Baghdad at the time.

== Sources ==
- Busse, Heribert (2004) [1969]. Chalif und Grosskönig - Die Buyiden im Irak (945-1055) [Caliph and Great King - The Buyids in Iraq (945-1055)] (in German). Würzburg: Ergon Verlag. ISBN 3-89913-005-7.
- Küçükaşcı, Mustafa Sabri (2001). "Kādir-Billâh". TDV Encyclopedia of Islam, Vol. 24 (Kāânî-i Şîrâzî – Kastamonu) (in Turkish). Istanbul: Presidency of Religious Affairs, Centre for Islamic Studies. pp. 127–128. ISBN 978-975-389-451-7.
- Sourdel, D. (1978). "al-Ḳādir Bi'llāh". In van Donzel, E.; Lewis, B.; Pellat, Ch. & Bosworth, C. E. (eds.). The Encyclopaedia of Islam, Second Edition. Volume IV: Iran–Kha. Leiden: E. J. Brill. pp. 378–379. doi:10.1163/1573-3912_islam_SIM_3761. ISBN 978-90-04-05745-6. OCLC 758278456.
