= Revolt of Tyre (996–998) =

Siege by the Fatimids

- Part of the Arab–Byzantine wars
Date	996 – May 998
Location	Tyre, Lebanon
Result	Fatimid victory

Belligerents
Citizens of Tyre; Byzantine Empire	Fatimid Caliphate

Commanders and leaders
'Allaqa (executed)	al-Hakim bi-Amr Allah; Abu Abdallah al-Husayn ibn Nasir al-Dawla; Yaqut

The Revolt of Tyre was an anti-Fatimid rebellion by the populace of the city of Tyre, in modern Lebanon. It began in 996, when the people, led by an ordinary sailor named 'Allaqa, rose up against the Fatimid government. The Fatimid Caliph al-Hakim bi-Amr Allah sent his army and navy to retake the city under Abu Abdallah al-Husayn ibn Nasir al-Dawla and the freedman Yaqut. Based in the nearby cities of Tripoli and Sidon, the Fatimid forces blockaded Tyre by land and sea for two years, during which a Byzantine squadron's attempt to reinforce the defenders was repulsed by the Fatimid navy with heavy losses. In the end, Tyre fell in May 998, was plundered and its defenders were either massacred or taken captive to Egypt, where 'Allaqa was flayed alive and crucified, while many of his followers, as well as 200 Byzantine captives, were executed.

== See also ==
- 10th century in Lebanon
- Mardaite revolts

== Sources ==
- Canard, Marius (1961). "Les sources arabes de l'histoire byzantine aux confins des Xe et XIe siècles". Revue des études byzantines. 19: 284–314 (297–298). doi:10.3406/rebyz.1961.1264.
- Gil, Moshe (1997) [1983]. A History of Palestine, 634–1099. Translated by Ethel Broido. Cambridge: Cambridge University Press. pp. 369–370. ISBN 0-521-59984-9.
- Schlumberger, Gustave (1900). L'Épopée byzantine à la fin du Xe siècle. Seconde partie, Basile II le tueur de Bulgares (in French). Paris: Hachette et Cie. pp. 107–108.
