= Muhammad ibn al-Musayyab =

Abu'l-Dhawwad Muhammad ibn al-Musayyab

Emir of Mosul
- Reign: 990–991/2
- Predecessor: Abu Tahir Ibrahim and Abu Abdallah al-Husayn
- Successor: Abu Ja'far al-Hajjaj
- Died: 996
- Dynasty: Uqaylid
- Father: Al-Musayyab

Abu'l-Dhawwād Muḥammad ibn al-Musayyab was the first Emir of Mosul from the Uqaylid dynasty, from c. 990–991/2.

== Life ==
Muhammad and the Uqaylid dynasty belonged to the Banu Uqayl, a northern Arab tribe who were originally clients of the Hamdanid emirs of Mosul. The Buyids captured Mosul and much of Upper Mesopotamia from the Hamdanids in the late 970s. This development resulted in the strengthening of the position of the Uqayl ruling family, as the Buyid emir Adud al-Dawla gave them his backing and made them responsible for maintaining discipline among the tribe.

In the 980s, Buyid rule was challenged by the Kurdish chieftain Badh ibn Dustak. Left without support from Baghdad, the local Buyid governor turned to the Uqayl and the Banu Numayr for assistance. This made the Arab tribes even more powerful, and in 989, the Buyid emir Baha al-Dawla sent the Hamdanid brothers Abu Tahir Ibrahim and Abu Abdallah al-Husayn to Mosul, in the hope that their local ties would mobilize opposition against Badh, and keep the Arab tribes reined in.

The Hamdanids were indeed received with enthusiasm by the local population, to such a degree that they rose in revolt and expelled the Buyid governor from Mosul. The Uqayl backed the Hamdanids, and received control of the towns of Jazirat ibn Umar, Nisibis, and Balad (north of Mosul), in exchange. Exploiting the turmoil, Badh attacked Mosul in the next year, but was defeated and killed by the numerically inferior Uqayl forces in battle near Balad. A Hamdanid counter-offensive followed in the region of Amida, but failed to score any success. Indeed, al-Husayn was taken prisoner, finding refuge with the Fatimids after his release, while Ibrahim fled to Uqaylid-held Nisibis, where Muhammad took him and his son Ali prisoner and killed them. At the same time, Muhammad also sidelined his principal Bedouin rival, the leader of the Banu Numayr, and secured control of Mosul and its province.

In 991/2, however, the Uqayl were defeated by a Buyid army under Abu Ja'far al-Hajjaj, and in a peace concluded in the next year, they had to again recognize Buyid suzerainty. They kept control of districts around Mosul, but the city itself became the seat of al-Hajjaj as Buyid governor and abandon Mosul.

Muhammad died in 996, and a succession struggle followed between his brothers, Ali and al-Muqallad, resulting in a shared authority and weakening the Uqaylid emirate, although during this time, the Buyids were evicted from Mosul altogether.

== Sources ==
- Bosworth, C. E. (2000). "ʿUḳaylids". In Bearman, P. J.; Bianquis, Th.; Bosworth, C. E.; van Donzel, E. & Heinrichs, W. P. (eds.). The Encyclopaedia of Islam, Second Edition. Volume X: T–U. Leiden: E. J. Brill. pp. 786–787. doi:10.1163/1573-3912_islam_COM_1274. ISBN 978-90-04-11211-7.
- Busse, Heribert (2004) [1969]. Chalif und Grosskönig - Die Buyiden im Irak (945-1055) [Caliph and Great King - The Buyids in Iraq (945-1055)] (in German). Würzburg: Ergon Verlag. ISBN 3-89913-005-7.
- Kennedy, Hugh (2004) [1986]. The Prophet and the Age of the Caliphates: The Islamic Near East from the 6th to the 11th Century (Second ed.). Harlow: Longman. ISBN 978-0-582-40525-7.

Preceded by Abu Tahir Ibrahim and Abu Abdallah al-Husayn	Emir of Mosul c. 990–991/2	Succeeded by Abu Ja'far al-Hajjaj
