= Al-Hajjaj ibn Ustadh Hurmuz =

11th-century general, official and governor

Abu Ja'far al-Hajjaj ibn Ustadh Hurmuz was a Buyid general and governor.

Hajjaj's father had served the Buyid emir Adud al-Dawla as a high official, while his brother Hasan initially served Adud al-Dawla's son Samsam al-Dawla. Hajjaj himself entered the service of Baha al-Dawla, another son of Adud al-Dawla. In 991/2 he led an army to defeat the Uqaylids, becoming governor of Mosul in the aftermath, until he was evicted by the Uqaylid al-Muqallad ibn al-Musayyab in 996.

Thereafter Hajjaj was appointed as governor of Khuzistan, but his rule was marked by such arbitrariness that Baha al-Dawla replaced him in April/May 1001 by his brother, Hasan. Baha al-Dawla then appointed him as nazir and governor of Baghdad, and charged him with the city's defence against an Uqaylid–Asadid alliance advancing on it under the command of Qirwash ibn al-Muqallad. With the assistance of the Bedouin tribe of Banu Khafaja and the Kurdish Annazids, Hajjaj managed to rout the allies at Baziqiya. The allied army divided, and the tribes were then defeated individually.

In October 1002, Hajjaj was again succeeded as governor of Baghdad by his brother, Hasan. This angered Hajjaj, who defected with his followers to the Kurdish ruler Badr ibn Hasanwayh, and marched with him to lay siege to Baghdad in summer 1004. When the Buyids defeated Badr's ally Abu'l-Abbas ibn Wasil, who had seized control of Basra, Badr gave up the attack on Baghdad and withdrew north. Hajjaj then reconciled with Baha al-Dawla. He died in October/November 1009 at Ahwaz.

== Sources ==
- Busse, Heribert (2004) [1969]. Chalif und Grosskönig - Die Buyiden im Irak (945-1055) [Caliph and Great King - The Buyids in Iraq (945-1055)] (in German). Würzburg: Ergon Verlag. ISBN 3-89913-005-7.
- Kennedy, Hugh (2004). The Prophet and the Age of the Caliphates: The Islamic Near East from the 6th to the 11th Century (Second ed.). Harlow: Longman. ISBN 978-0-582-40525-7.

Preceded by Muhammad ibn al-Musayyab as Uqaylid emir	Buyid governor of Mosul; 991/2–996	Succeeded by Al-Muqallad ibn al-Musayyab as Uqaylid emir
