= Shi'a Century =

Period of Islamic history

- 945–1055
| Abbasid era | Turks era Sunni Revival |
- Monarch(s): Hamdanid dynasty Fatimid Caliphate; Buyid dynasty Mazyadid Emirate
- Leader(s): Sayf al-Dawla; Abu Firas al-Hamdani; Abd Allah al-Mahdi Billah al-Mu'izz li-Din Allah al-Aziz Billah; Imad al-Dawla 'Adud al-Dawla; Sharaf al-Dawla; Sadaqa I Dubays II

The Shi'a Century or Shi'ite Century is a historiographical term sometimes used to describe the period between 945 and 1055, when Shi'a Muslim regimes, most notably the Fatimids and the Buyids, held sway over the central lands of the Islamic world.

== Background ==
In the late 9th century, the Abbasid Caliphate began to fragment. A succession of internal crises—the "Anarchy at Samarra" and the Zanj Rebellion—weakened the central government and gave rise to a series of regional dynasties in the provinces of the Abbasid empire. During this time, opposition to the faltering Abbasid regime was increasingly expressed by radical Shi'a sects, many of which were born and grew during the 9th century in the Abbasid metropolitan region of Iraq, before spreading to the periphery of the Islamic world.

== Rise of Shi'a influence ==
The weakness of the Abbasid regime allowed the creation of a number of Shi'a regimes in the remoter corners of the Islamic world, such as the Zaydi states in Tabaristan (in 864) and Yemen (in 897), but most notably, it provided the opportunity for the massive spread of the clandestine millennialist Isma'ili missionary movement, which gave birth to the Qarmatians and the Fatimid Caliphate. The Fatimid Caliphate, established in 909 in Ifriqiya, quickly came to control North Africa, conquered Egypt in 969, and expanded into the Levant, while the Qarmatians established a state of their own in Bahrayn in 899, raided Iraq and the Levant, and even sacked Mecca in 930.

In the meantime, following a temporary revival under the caliphs al-Mu'tadid and al-Muktafi, the Abbasid Caliphate declined quickly during the early 10th century as a result of ineffective leadership under Caliph al-Muqtadir (r. 908–932), infighting between the army and the bureaucrats, and financial mismanagement. This culminated in 945 in the capture of Baghdad by the pro-Shi'a Buyids, who had emerged from humble origins to rule over much of Iran during the previous decade. Although the Buyids retained the Abbasid caliphate, for the next century the Abbasid caliphs were more or less powerless puppets under Buyid control. The Buyids sponsored Shi'a scholarship, and it was under their patronage that Twelver Shi'ism acquired a definite form both as a sect and as a distinct community, with the elaboration of a specifically Twelver doctrine, and the creation of specifically Shi'a festivals and ritual practices. During the later 10th century, under the Hamdanid rulers of Aleppo, northern Syria became a major centre of Shi'ism, while the same period saw the emergence of the Alawite and Druze sects.

== End ==
The period of Shi'a predominance came to an end with the "Sunni Revival", a resurgence of orthodox Sunni Islam initiated by the Abbasid caliph al-Qadir's formalization of Sunni doctrines, and carried out in the political sphere through the conquests of the Sunni Seljuk Empire in the mid-11th century. The great Seljuk vizier Nizam al-Mulk furthered the Sunni intellectual counteroffensive by sponsoring a network of Sunni public schools across the Seljuk domains.

== Sources ==
- Bennison, Amira K. (2009). The Great Caliphs. The Golden Age of the ʿAbbasid Empire. New Haven and London: Yale University Press. ISBN 978-0-3001-5227-2.
- Bonner, Michael (2010). "The waning of empire, 861–945". In Robinson, Chase F. (ed.). The New Cambridge History of Islam, Volume 1: The Formation of the Islamic World, Sixth to Eleventh Centuries. Cambridge: Cambridge University Press. pp. 305–359. ISBN 978-0-521-83823-8.
- Griffel, Frank (2006). "Sunni Revival". In Meri, Josef W. (ed.). Medieval Islamic Civilization: An Encyclopedia. New York and London: Routledge. pp. 782–783. ISBN 978-0-415-96690-0.
- Humphreys, Stephen (2010). "Syria". In Robinson, Chase F. (ed.). The New Cambridge History of Islam, Volume 1: The Formation of the Islamic World, Sixth to Eleventh Centuries. Cambridge: Cambridge University Press. pp. 506–540. ISBN 978-0-521-83823-8.
- Kennedy, Hugh (2004) [1986]. The Prophet and the Age of the Caliphates: The Islamic Near East from the 6th to the 11th Century (Second ed.). Harlow: Longman. ISBN 978-0-582-40525-7.
