= Al-Qadir =

Abbasid Caliph in Baghdad (r. 991–1031)

Al-Qadir القادر
- Khalifah; Amir al-Mu'minin
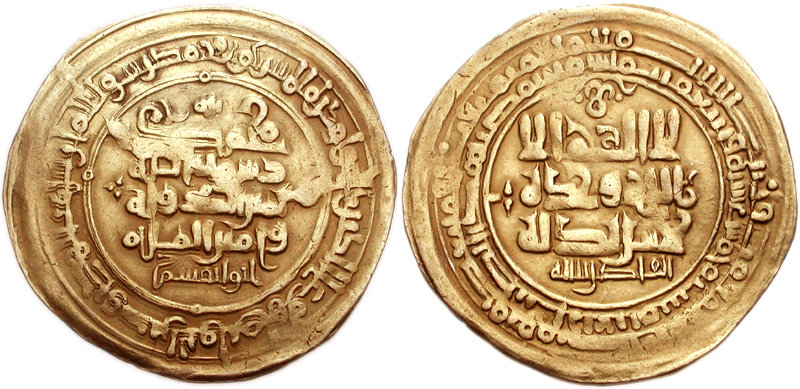
- Gold dinar of Mahmud of Ghazni, citing al-Qadir as caliph

25th Caliph of the Abbasid Caliphate Abbasid Caliph in Baghdad
- Reign: 22 November 991 – 29 November 1031
- Predecessor: al-Ta'i
- Successor: al-Qa'im
- Born: 28 September 947; Baghdad, Abbasid Caliphate
- Died: 29 November 1031 (aged 84); Baghdad, Abbasid Caliphate
- Burial: Baghdad
- Consort: Sakinah bint Baha al-Dawla (m. 993); Qatr al-Nada
- Issue: Al-Ghalib; Al-Qa'im; Abu'l-Qasim; Fatima (died 1056)
- Dynasty: Abbasid
- Father: Ishaq ibn al-Muqtadir
- Mother: Dimna
- Religion: Sunni Islam

Abu'l-Abbas Ahmad ibn Ishaq (Arabic: أبو العباس أحمد بن إسحاق, romanized: Abu'l-ʿAbbās Aḥmad ibn Isḥāq; 28 September 947 – 29 November 1031), better known by his regnal name al-Qadir (القادر بالله, al-Qādir bi’llāh, lit. 'Made powerful by God'), was the Abbasid caliph in Baghdad from 991 to 1031.

Born as an Abbasid prince outside the main line of succession, al-Qadir received a good education, including in the tenets of the Shafi'i school of Islamic jurisprudence. He rose to the throne after his cousin, al-Ta'i', was deposed by the Buyid ruler of Iraq, Baha al-Dawla. Although still under Buyid tutelage and with limited real power even in Baghdad, al-Qadir was able to gradually increase the authority of his office over time, exploiting the rivalries of the Buyid emirs and the caliphate's role as a fount of legitimacy and religious guidance. Al-Qadir was able to nominate his own heirs without interference by the Buyids, and was instrumental in securing control of Baghdad for the Buyid emir Jalal al-Dawla. At the same time, he sought champions further afield, notably in the person of Mahmud of Ghazni, who sought caliphal recognition for his conquests, providing funds in return. In the religious sphere, al-Qadir placed himself as the champion of Sunni Islam against Shi'a Islam, represented by the Buyids as well as by the Fatimid Caliphate of Cairo. He denounced the Fatimids in the Baghdad Manifesto of 1011, and issued proclamations that for the first time codified Sunni doctrine in the so-called 'Qadiri Creed', taking the side of the traditionalist Hanbali school against the rationalist Mu'tazilites. Al-Qadir's religious policies cemented the Sunni–Shi'a split, as the followers of divergent doctrines were denounced as infidels and made licit to be killed as a result. His reign heralded the re-emergence of the Abbasid caliphate as an independent political actor, and presaged the so-called 'Sunni Revival' later in the century.

== Early life ==
Abu'l-Abbas Ahmad, the future al-Qadir, was born on 28 September 947 in Baghdad. His father Ishaq was a son of caliph al-Muqtadir (r. 908–932), and his mother Tammani or Dimna was a slave concubine.

Shortly before his birth, in December 945, Baghdad and the rest of Iraq had been taken over by the Buyids. Although the Buyids were pro-Shi'a, they had retained the Abbasid caliphate for reasons of legitimacy. The Buyids ruled Iraq ostensibly as caliphal commander-in-chiefs (amīr al-umarāʾ), but in practice they had reduced the Abbasid caliphs to puppet rulers, confined to their palaces. Like many Abbasid princes of the time, Ahmad lived in the Tahirid Palace of Baghdad.

As an Abbasid prince, Ahmad received a good education. When his father Ishaq died in March 988, Ahmad quarreled with his half-sister, Amina, over the inheritance. She reported him to their cousin, Caliph al-Ta'i (r. 974–991), as plotting to replace him as caliph. To escape capture, Ahmad went into hiding for a while, before seeking refuge with the governor of the swamps of Bathihah near Basra, Muhadhdhib al-Dawla, for about three years. From there, Ahmad plotted against al-Ta'i, harping on his own loyalty to the Buyids, whereas al-Ta'i had been installed by a Turkic general, Sabuktakin.

== Caliphate ==
The domains of the Buyid dynasty, controlling Iraq and large parts of Iran, and the other states of the Middle East in the late 10th century

In 991, the Buyid ruler of Iraq, Baha al-Dawla (r. 988–1012), deposed al-Ta'i, because the latter had been showing signs of independence. In his stead, Baha al-Dawla appointed al-Qadir to the caliphate on 22 November 991 (12 Ramadan 381 AH). The deposed al-Ta'i was kept in captivity until his death twelve years later. Despite their previous differences, al-Qadir treated his predecessor well. Unlike earlier deposed caliphs, al-Ta'i was not blinded and continued to be treated with the respect owed to a reigning caliph.

=== Early years ===
The accession of the new caliph was not without its troubles. On his way from Bathihah he was held up by Turkic soldiery who extracted promises of a donative payment, and the first solemn Friday sermon (khuṭba) in his name was likewise delayed by Turkic and Daylamite troops clamouring for money. Aged 45, al-Qadir was the oldest Abbasid caliph to ascend the throne, and it was expected that he would be a pliant figurehead. At first, al-Qadir indeed seemed to bear out this image, approving Baha al-Dawla's nominations of officials and supporting his policies. New titles were conferred on Baha al-Dawla, and al-Qadir even agreed to marry the Buyid's daughter, although she died just before the wedding was to take place. Seeing him as a Buyid puppet, the dynasts of the eastern Islamic world delayed recognition, and it was not until 1000 that the Samanids and Ghaznavids recognized al-Qadir's caliphate. Even the Buyid emir Fakhr al-Dawla, who ruled large parts of central and northern Iran until his death in 997, refused to recognize al-Qadir, continuing to mint coins in al-Ta'i's name. The only independent actions taken during the first decade of his caliphate were the completion in 993/4 of a Friday mosque in the Harbiyya quarter of Baghdad, begun by his uncle al-Muti' (r. 946–974), and the public proclamation of his son Muhammad, then just eight or nine years old, as heir apparent, with the title of al-Ghalib Bi'llah, in 1001.

Al-Qadir faced two usurpation attempts during this time. About 998, a certain Abdallah ibn Ja'far, a close relative of the deposed al-Ta'i, pretended to be the escaped caliph in Gilan and even gained the backing of the local ruler for a time, before he was discovered. At about the same time, in Transoxiana, another distant cousin, Abdallah ibn Uthman, a descendant of the 9th-century caliph al-Wathiq, pretended to be al-Qadir's designated heir and won the support of the local Karakhanid ruler. Al-Qadir used the event as an excuse to publicly proclaim his son as heir, bypassing the need to seek Buyid approval. The Karakhanids soon recognized the Abbasid caliph's suzerainty for the first time, and dropped their support of the pretender. The pretender then arrived in Baghdad, where he secretly gathered support, before moving again to the east via Basra, Kufa, and Kirman. He was finally arrested by the Ghaznavids on al-Qadir's orders, and died in captivity.

=== Relations with the Buyids ===
Ambitious to subdue the Buyid emirates to the east under his own rule, Baha al-Dawla forced al-Qadir to finance the military preparations to that effect, which progressively emptied the caliphal coffers. Nevertheless, Baha al-Dawla's successes also had positive corollary: following his conquest of western Iran in 998, the Buyid moved his residence to Shiraz. This effectively downgraded Baghdad and Iraq to a mere province, but also left al-Qadir more room for independent activity, which he used to strengthen his authority. While Baha al-Dawla had previously imposed his own candidates even as members of the caliphal court, al-Qadir was now able to establish his own chancery and nominate his own officials, often from among officials who had served under al-Ta'i. Al-Qadir is also recorded as having a separate postal and information service, which he may have (re-)established. The appointment of a vizier on the other hand had to wait the next reign; al-Qadir's chief ministers had to content themselves with the title of 'secretary' (kātib). For most of al-Qadir's caliphate, this post was held by al-Hajib al-Nu'man, who served from 992 until his death in 1030, with a brief interruption in 998.

Baha al-Dawla died in 1012, and was succeeded by his son, Sultan al-Dawla (r. 1012–1024). The succession did nothing to halt the decline of the Buyid power in Iraq, or the mounting Sunni–Shi'a tensions. The Buyid emirs that followed Baha al-Dawla were also increasingly engaged in an unrestrained competition for supremacy amongst themselves, in which control of Baghdad and of the caliph, who could dispense titles and tokens of legitimacy, was of central importance. This in turn gave al-Qadir greater freedom of action, and placed him on much better and more equal footing with Baha al-Dawla's successors, who were careful to maintain good relations with the caliph. Sultan al-Dawla did not come to Iraq for his investiture ceremony as amīr al-umarāʾ, which was carried out in absentia. In contrast to previous occasions, the gifts sent to the caliphal court were modest, while the poverty of al-Qadir had reached such extent that the palace had to be decorated for the occasion with rugs and drapes provided by the governor of Baghdad.

In 1021, Sultan al-Dawla ceded rule over Iraq to his younger brother, Musharrif al-Dawla (r. 1021–1025). The latter came to Baghdad in March 1023, and ordered al-Qadir to come to him. Al-Qadir complied, but when Musharrif al-Dawla went on to renew the oath of allegiance of the Turkic military officers without asking for the Caliph's permission, al-Qadir protested, and in return secured a pledge of fidelity from Musharrif al-Dawla. When the latter died in 1025, Musharrif al-Dawla's brother Jalal al-Dawla (r. 1027–1044) and his nephew, Abu Kalijar, clashed over his inheritance. The latter was proclaimed as amīr al-umarāʾ by the soldiery, and initially recognized as such by the Caliph, but he was toppled when the troops eventually defected to Jalal al-Dawla. The caliph played a central role in these events, mediating with the Turkic soldiery in favour of Jalal al-Dawla, so that, according to the historian Heribert Busse, "the installation of Jalal al-Dawla was the achievement of al-Qadir". Jalal al-Dawla entered Baghdad in 1026 and began curtailing the caliph's powers, but his rule was short-lived, as once again the troops turned against him. Al-Qadir sent a delegation to inform him that he must leave the capital, and prohibited him from returning for several years.

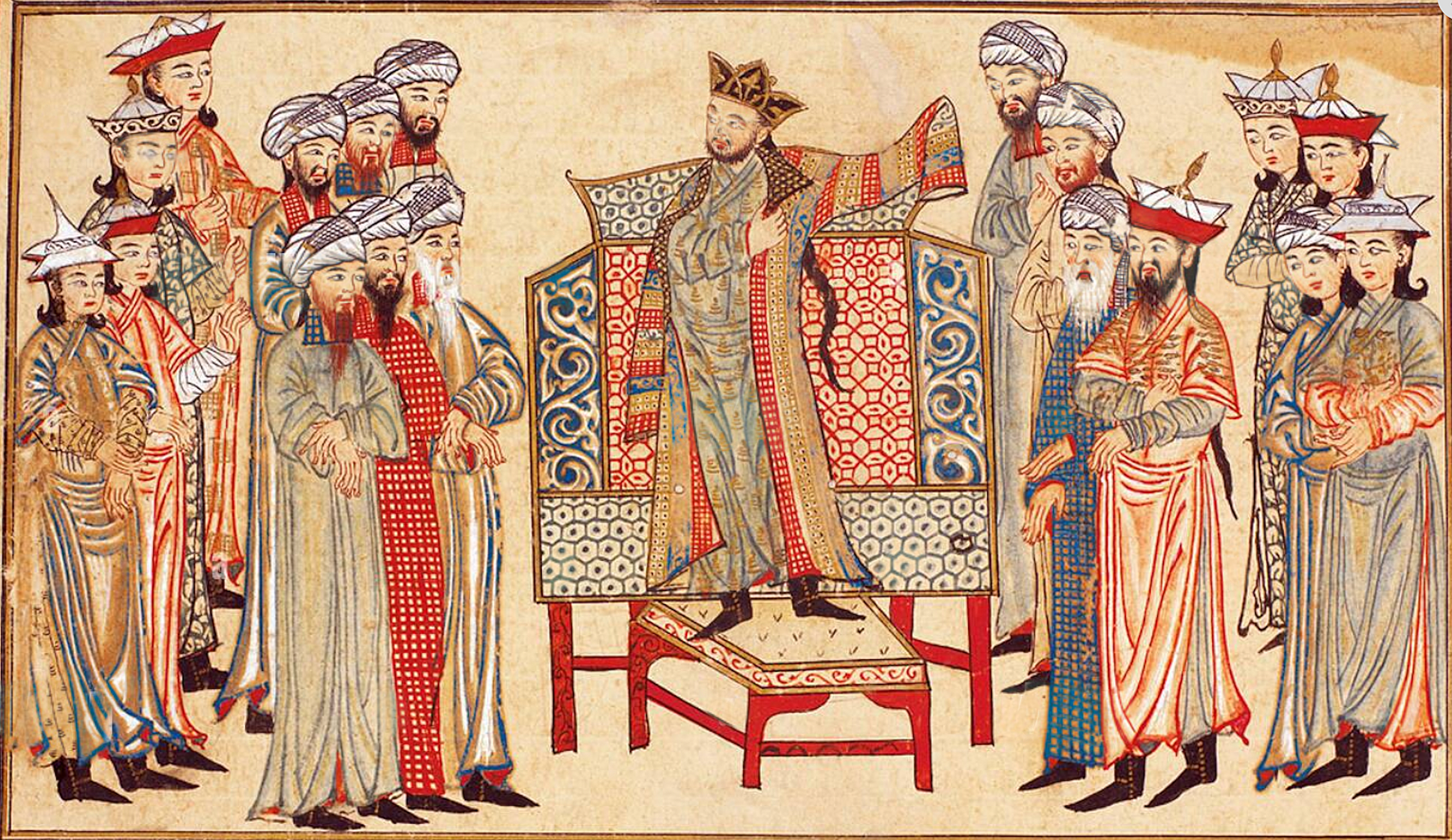
Mahmud of Ghazni receiving a richly decorated robe of honor from the caliph al-Qadir in 1000, miniature from Rashid al-Din's Jami' al-tawarikh.

Al-Qadir's efforts to re-establish his authority against the Buyids were aided by the broad popular support he could count on among the Sunni population of Baghdad, the decline of Buyid power, and the emergence of Mahmud of Ghazni (r. 998–1030) in the east, who was not only a political opponent of the Buyids, but also a champion of Sunni orthodoxy. The recognition of Mahmud by al-Qadir took place independently of the Buyids, while conversely Mahmud's recognition of his suzerainty was a boost to the caliph's position. The Ghaznavid ruler regularly kept al-Qadir informed of his campaigns, requesting caliphal confirmation for his rule over the countries he had conquered. Al-Qadir had reports of Mahmud's victories read publicly in the mosques, a gesture that historian Tayeb El-Hibri describes as a barely veiled gibe against the Buyids, and in turn rewarded Mahmud with lofty titles, walī amīr al-muʾminīn ('friend of the commander of the faithful') and yamīn al-dawla wa amīn al-milla ('right hand of the state and trustee of the community'). As the historian Michael Brett explains, this arrangement suited both men: for al-Qadir, nominating a powerful prince as his surrogate was a substitute for real power; while for Mahmud, caliphal recognition legitimized his position and his plans for conquests against diverse 'infidels', primarily India to the south, but also the Buyids to the west. Mahmud's lavish gifts also helped alleviate somewhat the poverty of the caliph as a result of Buyid exactions; nevertheless, at his death, al-Qadir left an empty treasury.

=== Championing of Sunnism ===
Although al-Qadir held no temporal political power, he nevertheless managed to exploit the opportunities he was presented with to greatly restore the moral and religious authority of the caliphate. In this, he made good use of his own education in Islamic jurisprudence (fiqh), which gave him an authority to speak as a member of the emerging class of religious scholars (ʿulamāʾ). The Abbasids had traditionally been followers of the Hanafi school of jurisprudence, but this association was broken in the Buyid period, in favour of the Shafi'i school. The Shafi'is were supported by the Buyids, in large part due to the convergence between Shafi'i and Shi'a doctrines. As a young prince, al-Qadir was thus taught by the Shafi'i scholar Ahmad ibn Muhammad al-Harawi, and his credentials in fiqh were enough for the 14th-century Shafi'i scholar Taqi al-Din al-Subki to count among the prominent scholars belonging to his school. As caliph, however, al-Qadir was to hew closer to the doctrines of the conservative traditionalist Hanbali school.

The first major clash with the Buyids over religious issues came with the appointment by Baha al-Dawla of the prominent pro-Shi'a Alid and dean of the Alids (naqīb al-ashrāf), Abu Ahmad al-Husayn ibn Musa, as the chief qāḍī (judge) at Baghdad in 1003/4. Seeing in this an attempt to impose Twelver jurisprudence against Sunni practices, al-Qadir put himself at the head of a popular Sunni reaction, and succeeded in reverting the nomination. From this point on, the caliph identified himself with a broad Sunni backlash against the Shi'a, both of the Twelver variant espoused by the Buyids, as well as the Isma'ili branch that was led by the rival Fatimid Caliphate. In this cause he succeeded in restoring the Sunni and Abbasid form of the khuṭba in Al-Yamama and Bahrayn. In 1006, a violent controversy broke out over a recension (muṣḥaf) of the Quran claimed to have belonged to Abd Allah ibn Mas'ud, which was espoused by Shi'a scholars against the canonical version, but firmly rejected by the Sunnis. Al-Qadir summoned a commission of scholars that condemned the recension in April 1006, and ordered the execution of a Shi'a partisan who anathematized those who burned it. It was only the intervention of Baha al-Dawla that calmed matters and prevented the disorders from spreading. To further lend authority to the canonical version of the Quran, in 1010 al-Qadir assisted at public readings from it during the Friday prayers, wearing the Mantle of Muhammad.

The affair had also highlighted another threat, namely the inroads of Fatimid propaganda in Baghdad, where the name of the Fatimid caliph, al-Hakim bi-Amr Allah (r. 996–1021) was hailed during the riots over Ibn Mas'ud's recension. This was a development that threatened the Sunni Abbasids and the Twelver Buyids alike. The Fatimid threat became especially apparent in August 1010, when Qirwash ibn al-Muqallad, the Uqaylid emir of Upper Mesopotamia, whose power stretched to the outskirts of Baghdad, recognized the suzerainty of the Fatimid caliph. Al-Qadir responded by sending an embassy to Baha al-Dawla that succeeded in getting the Buyid ruler to apply pressure on the Uqaylid emir, who soon returned to Abbasid allegiance. The Emirs of Mecca also recognized Fatimid suzerainty, and for many years, Hajj pilgrims from Iraq were unable to visit the city as the security of their passage could not be guaranteed. Al-Qadir tried to secure the protection of the pilgrim caravans from being attacked and extorted by Bedouin tribes by giving rule over the Yamama in central Arabia to the Bedouin chieftain Usayfir, but this had little success. Throughout the period, the safe passage of the caravans had to be purchased, often with donations provided by Islamic princes such as Mahmud of Ghazni for the purpose. Al-Qadir also tried to make the Emir of Mecca, Abu'l-Futuh, abandon the Fatimids and return to Abbasid allegiance, but without success.

As a further reaction against the Fatimids, in November 1011 al-Qadir issued the Baghdad Manifesto, signed by both Sunni and Twelver scholars. The document not only condemned the Fatimid Isma'ili doctrine as false, but denounced the Fatimid dynasty's claims to descent from Ali as fraudulent, and their followers as enemies of Islam. Singling out the Fatimids as the first target of his active involvement in public affairs was a clever move, as the Buyids not only tolerated it but regarded it as useful for their own purposes, and an attack on the rival Shi'a sect gathered support even from Twelver notables. This also left room for the Twelvers to reach an accommodation with the Abbasid caliphate; stories circulated that Ali himself, the fourth caliph and first Shi'a imam, had appeared in a dream prophesying his ascent to the throne. Twelver Alids continued to play an important role in Baghdad and Iraqi politics of the time, most prominently the brothers al-Sharif al-Radi and al-Sharif al-Murtada, sons of Abu Ahmad al-Husayn, who maintained close relations with the caliphal court and succeeded their father as naqīb al-ashrāf.

Al-Qadir's next target was the rationalist Mu'tazilite school, which had enjoyed the protection of the Buyids and whose members had often held the post of chief qāḍī in Baghdad under Buyid rule. Mu'tazilism had in the past been supported by Abbasid caliphs, most notably al-Ma'mun (r. 813–833), who even instituted the Inquisition-like mihna to persecute the traditionalists who refused to accept the Mu'tazilite doctrine of Quranic createdness. In the event, the persecution not only failed, but backfired: the mihna was suspended, and the traditionalist Hanbali school emerged with its prestige strengthened and its doctrines more influential than before. In 1017, al-Qadir unequivocally sided with his predecessors' opponents: he condemned Mu'tazilite as well as Shi'a doctrines, prohibited the teaching of Mu'tazilite doctrines or theological debate (kalām), and ordered those Hanafi jurists who had shown Mu'tazilite tendencies to do penance, on pain of corporal punishment and exile. Shortly after, on 27 January 1019, inspired by Hanbali ideas, the caliph issued a decree, the Risāla al-Qādiriyya ('Epistle of al-Qadir'), which for the first time explicitly formulated Sunni doctrine. The decree condemned Shi'a, Mu'tazilite, and even Asharite doctrines, and affirmed the veneration of the first four caliphs (the 'Rashidun') and of the Companions of Muhammad, as an obligation for all Muslims, against Shi'a beliefs that the first three caliphs had been illegitimate, as they had deprived Ali (the fourth caliph) of his rightful inheritance. All speculative theological debate was prohibited, along with the denigration of any of the Companions or even examination of the disputes in which they had been involved, and which had given rise to the first schisms in Islam. Quranic createdness was again singled out as heresy, its supporters branded as infidels "whose blood may legitimately be shed".

In 1029, al-Qadir reiterated and reinforced his theological doctrines; In three sessions on 2 September, 2 October, and 11 November, each more lengthy and elaborate than the previous one and held before an assembly of Alids, jurists, and other notables, the caliph once again denounced Mu'tazilism, condemned the doctrine of Quranic createdness, and reaffirmed the special status of the Rashidun caliphs and the need of "enjoining good and forbidding wrong". This coincided with the campaigns of Mahmud of Ghazni against the Shi'a, the Buyids (Ray was captured in 1029 and Kirman attacked two years later), and the Ghaznavid expansion into India, but also with the presence of Jalal al-Dawla on the Buyid throne, who was dependent on the caliph's goodwill. Thus al-Qadir was able to secure the dismissal of pro-Alid preachers, and the protection by armed escort of Sunni ones that were threatened by Shi'a partisans.

=== Death and succession ===
As al-Ghalib had died in January 1019, in 1030 al-Qadir named his younger son Abu Ja'far, the future al-Qa'im, as his heir, a decision also taken completely independently of the Buyid rulers. Al-Qadir died after an illness on 29 November 1031. Initially he was buried in the caliphal palace, but in the next year he was ceremonially moved to al-Rusafa, to a family mausoleum that may have been the same one as constructed by his father, al-Ta'i, where al-Qadir's parents were also buried. The succession of al-Qa'im was smooth and uncontested.

== Legacy ==
Medieval sources generally give a favourable view of al-Qadir as a mild-mannered and gentle person. He went out in disguise among the people, gave alms to the poor, and regularly attended public sessions where the commoners could voice their complaints (maẓālim). The renowned 12th-century Muslim religious scholar Ibn al-Jawzi lauded al-Qadir's personal religious devotion and piety, and held him to have been "one of the best Abbasid caliphs"; his personal austerity was such that the late 11th-century vizier and historian, Abu Shuja al-Rudhrawari, called him "the monk of the Abbasids". Both Ibn al-Jawzi and the slightly later historian Ibn al-Athir stress that during al-Qadir's reign, the Abbasid dynasty and the office of the caliphate began to recover their previous prestige and authority.

Al-Qadir's reign was an important turning point in the history of the Abbasid caliphate and Sunni Islam. Previous Abbasid caliphs had sympathized with rationalist schools like the Mu'tazilites, and been opposed by the conservative traditionalist Sunni scholars. One of the most notable Sunni scholars, Ahmad ibn Hanbal, founder of the Hanbali school, had been persecuted by the Inquisition-like miḥna, founded by Caliph al-Ma'mun (r. 813–833). Al-Qadir on the other hand succeeded in repositioning the caliphate as the champion of conservative Sunnism, specifically of the Hanbali branch. Apart from the decrees issued in his own name, he commissioned works by theologians and jurists. Al-Mawardi's al-Iqna or even his famous al-Ahkam al-Sultaniyya, the Mukhtasars of al-Quduri and Abd al-Wahhab al-Maliki, as well as a refutation of bāṭinī doctrines by Ali ibn Sa'id al-Istakhri, are said to have been composed on his request.

Al-Qadir's edicts do not survive in full in the sources, but a consolidated 'Qadiri Creed' (al-Iʿtiqād al-Qādirī), that has come down to the present day, was current by the reign of al-Qa'im. The establishment of such a creed a seminal moment in the history of Sunni Islam. Until then, the Sunnis had defined themselves mostly in opposition to the Shi'a, but, as the historian Hugh Kennedy put it, "now there was a body of positive belief which had to be accepted by anyone claiming to be a Sunni". Al-Qadir's statement of faith provided a definition of belief, and, conversely, of unbelief; giving Sunni jurists a template by which to issue rulings (fatwā). The condemnation of Shi'a practices further created a sharp distinction between Sunni and Shi'a, that had not hitherto been the case. The effect was, according to Kennedy, that "it was no longer possible to be simply a Muslim, one was either a Sunni or a Shi'a". Al-Qadir thus laid the ideological foundations for what has been termed the 'Sunni Revival' of the 11th century, which culminated with the destruction of the Buyids by the Seljuk Turks, a new steppe power who saw themselves as champions of Sunnism and of the Abbasid caliph.

Al-Qadir's forty-year rule, followed by a similarly long reign under al-Qa'im (1031–1075) that was in many ways a continuation of his own, restored stability to the Abbasid caliphate, and marked the re-emergence of the Abbasid caliphs as independent political actors. Although their direct authority was limited to Baghdad and its environs, the Abbasids wielded considerable influence across the wider Muslim world as sources of political legitimacy, and in the 12th century even managed to re-establish enough independent military power to secure rule of Iraq under their direct control.

== Sources ==
- Brett, Michael (2004). "ʿAbbasids, Fatimids and Seljuqs". In Luscombe, David; Riley-Smith, Jonathan (eds.). The New Cambridge Medieval History, Volume 4, c.1024–c.1198, Part 2. Cambridge: Cambridge University Press. pp. 675–720. ISBN 978-1-13905403-4.
- Busse, Heribert (2004) [1969]. Chalif und Grosskönig - Die Buyiden im Irak (945-1055) [Caliph and Great King - The Buyids in Iraq (945-1055)] (in German). Würzburg: Ergon Verlag. ISBN 3-89913-005-7.
- Donohue, John J. (2003). The Buwayhid Dynasty in Iraq 334 H./945 to 403 H./1012: Shaping Institutions for the Future. Leiden and Boston: Brill. ISBN 90-04-12860-3.
- El-Hibri, Tayeb (2021). The Abbasid Caliphate: A History. Cambridge and New York: Cambridge University Press. ISBN 978-1-107-18324-7.
- Griffel, Frank (2006). "Sunni Revival". In Meri, Josef W. (ed.). Medieval Islamic Civilization: An Encyclopedia. New York and London: Routledge. pp. 782–783. ISBN 978-0-415-96690-0.
- Hanne, Eric J. (2007). Putting the Caliph in His Place: Power, Authority, and the Late Abbasid Caliphate. Madison, New Jersey: Fairleigh Dickinson University Press. ISBN 978-0-8386-4113-2.
- Kennedy, Hugh (2004) [1986]. The Prophet and the Age of the Caliphates: The Islamic Near East from the 6th to the 11th Century (Second ed.). Harlow: Longman. ISBN 978-0-582-40525-7.
- Küçükaşcı, Mustafa Sabri (2001). "Kādir-Billâh". TDV Encyclopedia of Islam, Vol. 24 (Kāânî-i Şîrâzî – Kastamonu) (in Turkish). Istanbul: Presidency of Religious Affairs, Centre for Islamic Studies. pp. 127–128. ISBN 978-975-389-451-7.
- Makdisi, George (1997). Ibn 'Aqil: Religion and Culture in Classical Islam. Edinburgh: Edinburgh University Press. ISBN 0-7486-0960-1.
- Sourdel, D. (1978). "al-Ḳādir Bi'llāh". In van Donzel, E.; Lewis, B.; Pellat, Ch. & Bosworth, C. E. (eds.). The Encyclopaedia of Islam, Second Edition. Volume IV: Iran–Kha. Leiden: E. J. Brill. pp. 378–379. doi:10.1163/1573-3912_islam_SIM_3761. ISBN 978-90-04-05745-6. OCLC 758278456.
- Tholib, Udjang (2002). The Reign of the 'Abbāsid Caliph al-Qādir billāh (381/991-422/1031). Studies on the political, economic and religious aspects of his caliphate during the Buwayhid rule of Baghdād (PhD thesis). Montreal: Institute of Islamic Studies, McGill University.

Al-Qadir Abbasid dynasty Born: 947 Died: 29 November 1031
Sunni Islam titles
Preceded by Al-Ta'i'	Caliph of the Abbasids; 22 November 991 – 29 November 1031	Succeeded by Al-Qa'im
