= Khafaja =

Banū Khafaja (Tribe)
Regions with significant populations

Languages
- Arabic

Religion
- Islam

Khafaja or Khafajah (Arabic: خفاجة, also known as Al-Khafaji and Khafaji) is one of the major Arab tribes (especially in Iraq and Egypt) as well as Saudi Arabia, Syria and Jordan.

== See also ==
- Ibn Khafaja
- Shihab al-Din al-Khafaji
- Khafajah
- Khafajiyeh
- Banu Uqayl
