= Kitāb al-Diryāq =

Medieval Middle-Eastern manuscript

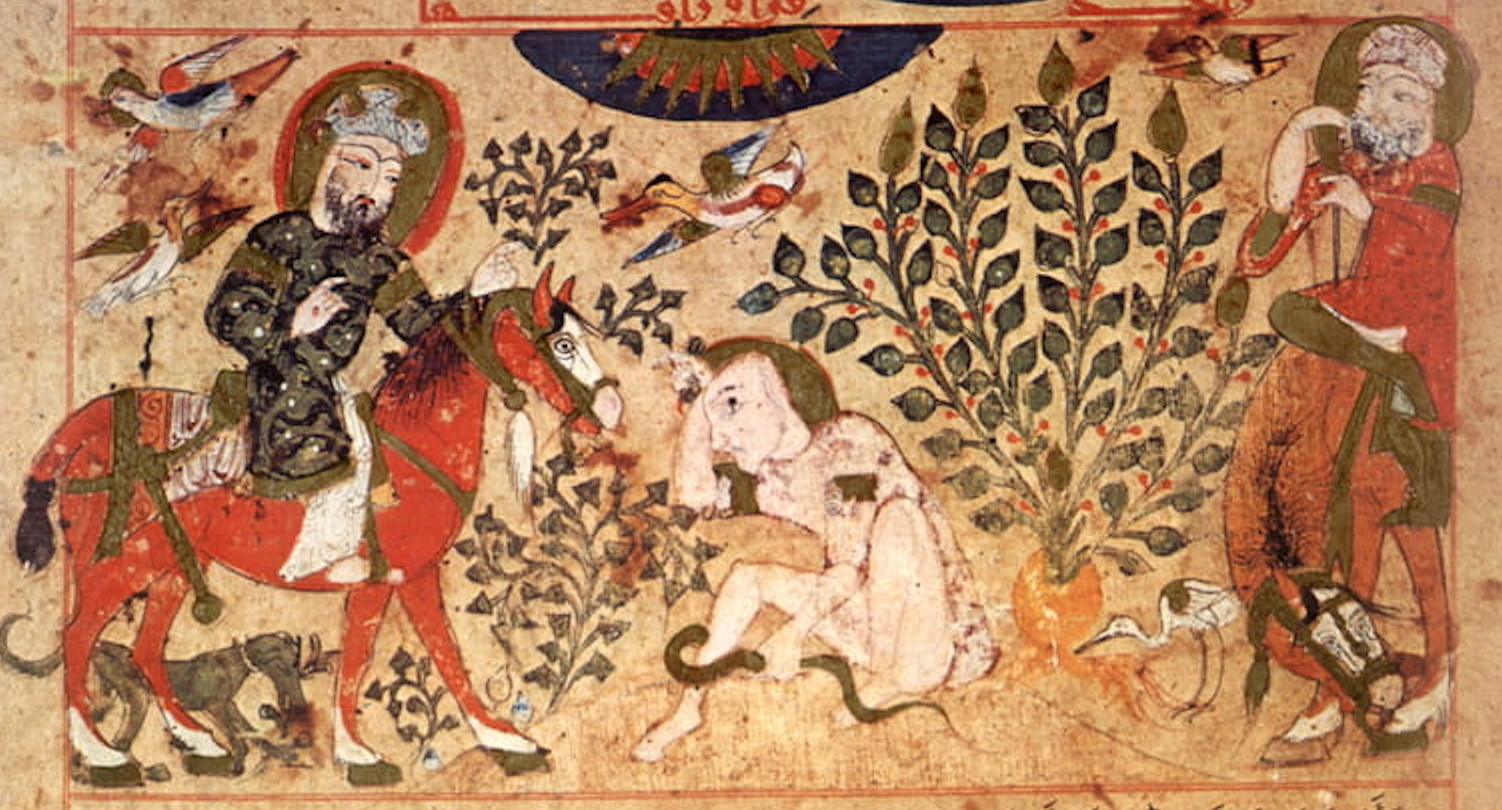
- Andromachus the Elder on horseback, questioning a patient who has received a snake bite. Kitâb al-Diryâq, 1198-1199, Syria.
- Author: Pseudo-Galen
- Original title: كتاب الدرياق
- Language: Arabic
- Subject: Medicine, Antidotes
- Genre: Non-fiction
- Publisher: Various (modern editions)
- Publication date: 12th, 13th centuries
- Publication place: Jazira (Syria or Northern Iraq)
- Media type: Manuscript, Print

Kitāb al-Diryāq (Arabic: كتاب الدرياق, "The Book of Theriac"), also Book of Anditodes of Pseudo-Galen or in French Traité de la thériaque, is a medieval Arabic book supposedly based on the writings of Galen ("pseudo-Galen"). The work describes the use of Theriac, an ancient medicinal compound initially used as a cure for the bites of poisonous snakes.

Two illustrated manuscript copies are extant, adorned with beautiful miniatures revealing of the social context at the time of their publication. The books describe various physicians of Antiquity, including Greek ones such as Andromachus the Elder, and their medical techniques. These manuscripts are generally attributed to the Jazira region of Syria and northern Iraq.

== Manuscripts ==
=== Paris, Bibliothèque Nationale de France, MS. Arabe 2964 (1198–1199) ===
Copied in 1198–1199, this book with miniatures (BNF Arabe 2964) is generally attributed to the Jazira (northern Syria or Northern Iraq). It was probably made in Mosul.

The dignitaries described in the miniatures wear the Turkic dress: the stiff coat with diagonal closing and arm bands. Scenes of daily life, such as agricultural work in the fields, are also depicted. Two beautiful moon deities are also depicted, holding the shape of a crescent moon in their hands, but their significance remains conjectural.

The ruler and attendants are similar to those found in the decorated Palmer Cup and in metalworks from the Mosul or North Jazira area, with their typical sharbush type of headgear and robes.

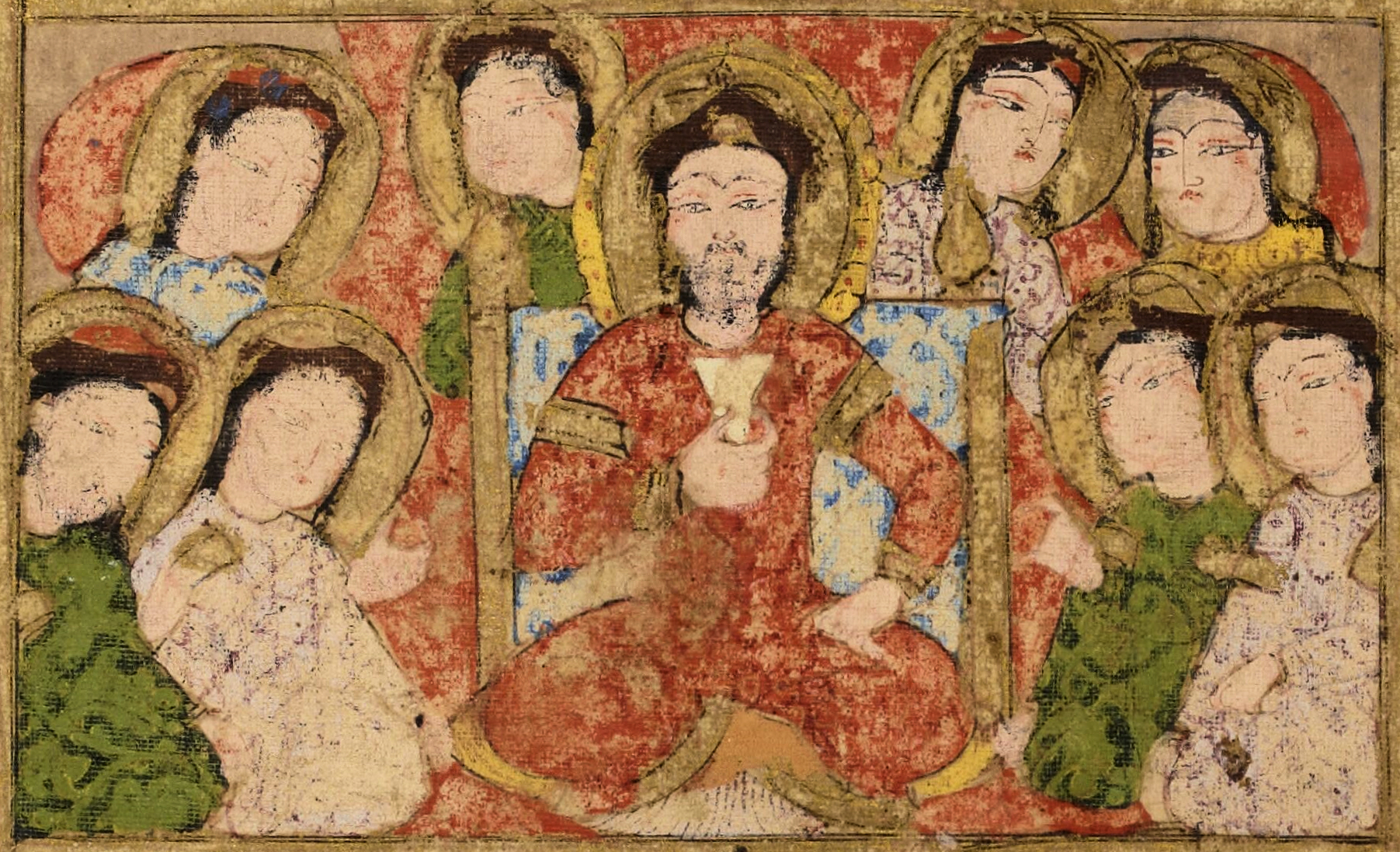
Kitâb al-Diryâq, folio 24 (royal court detail, ruler in Turkic dress, wearing the sharbush hat).

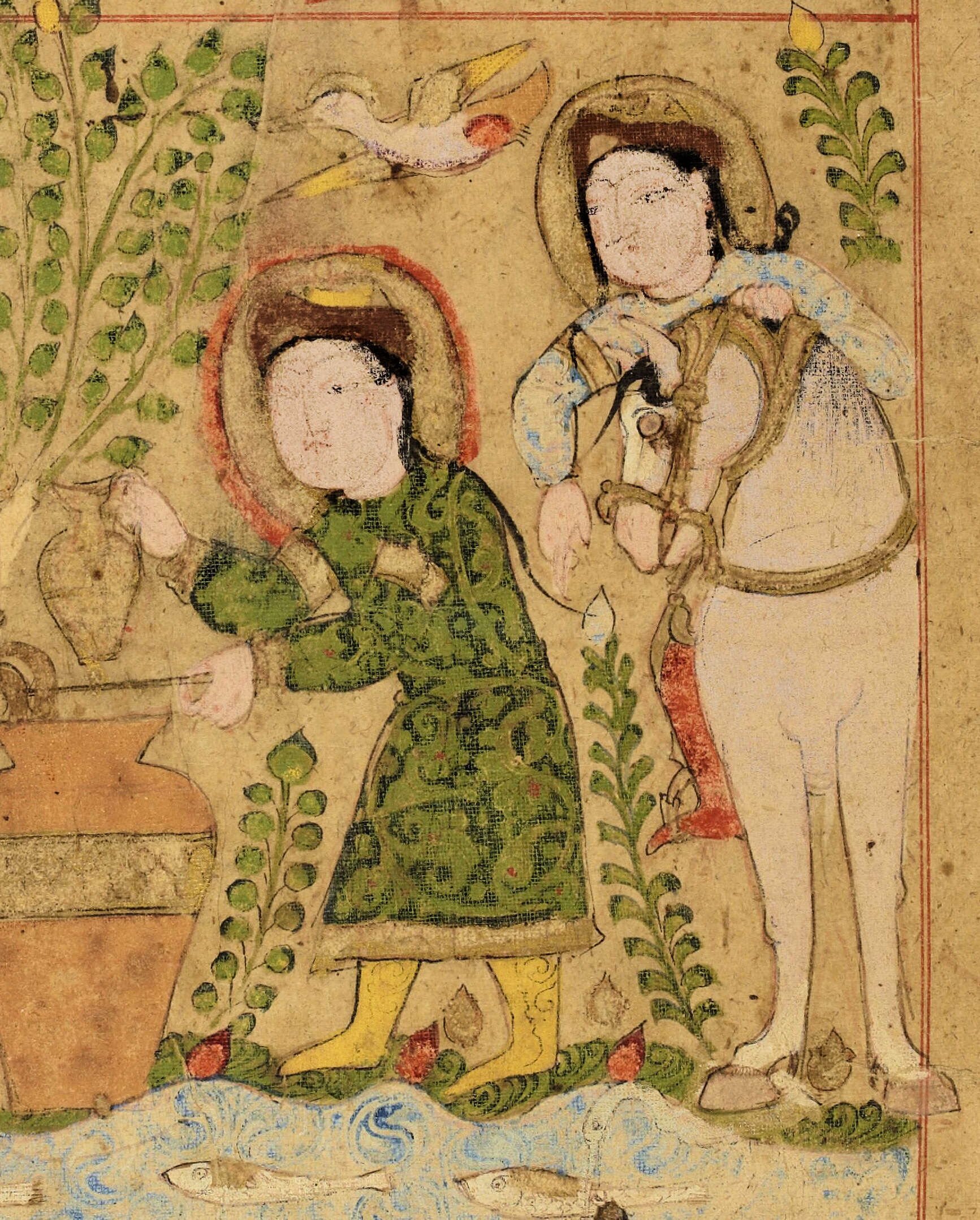
Figures in Turkic dress, with aqbiya turkiyya coat, tiraz armbands, boots and sharbush hat.

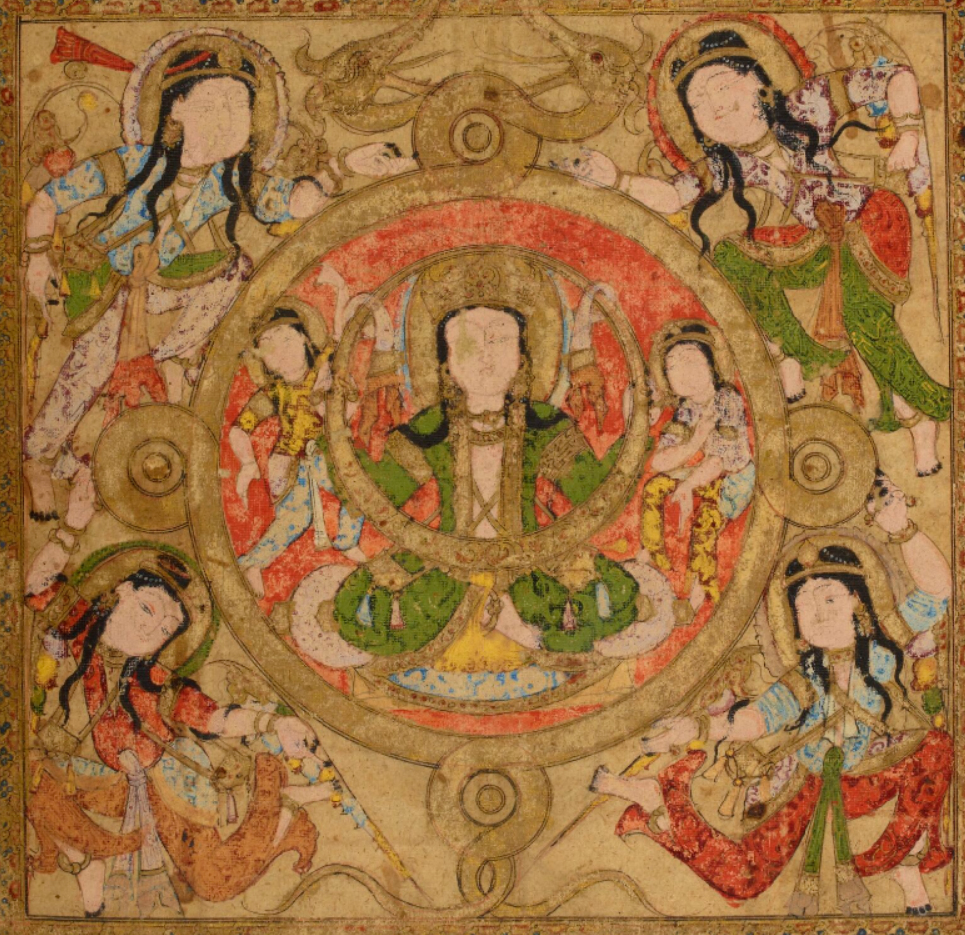
Kitâb al-Diryâq, folio 43. Moon deity

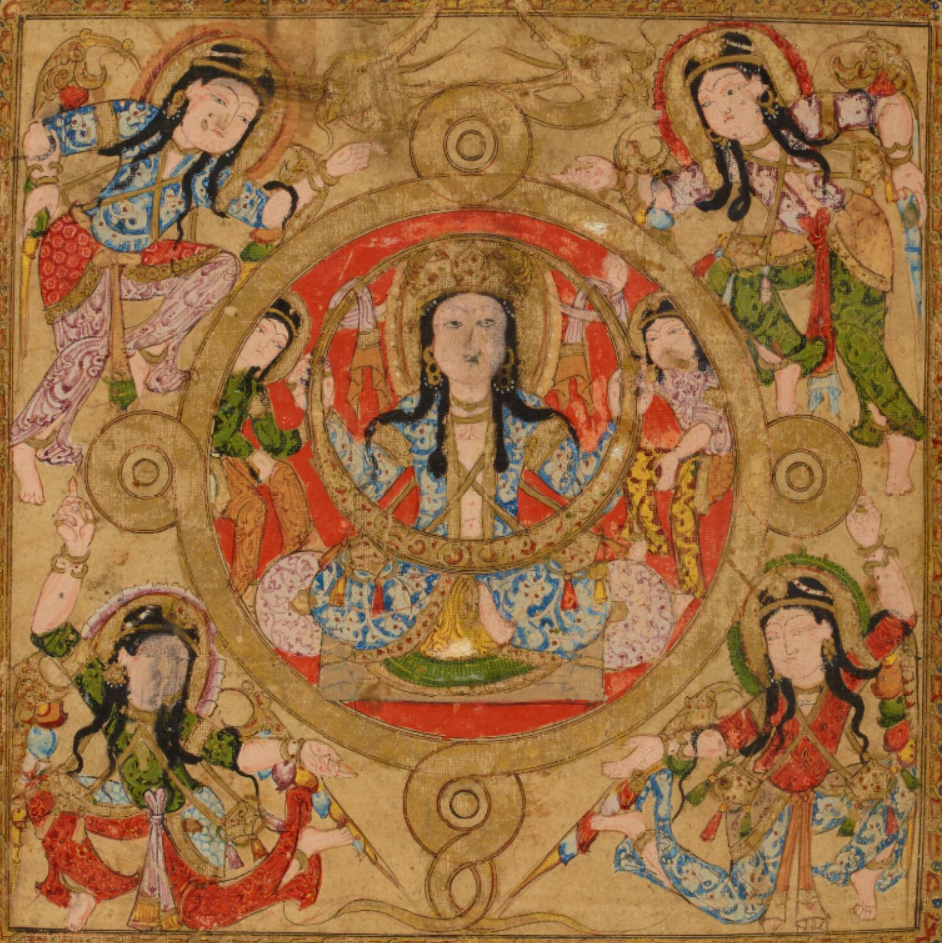
Kitâb al-Diryâq, folio 44. Moon deity

=== Vienna, National Library of Austria, A.F. 10 (1225-1250) ===
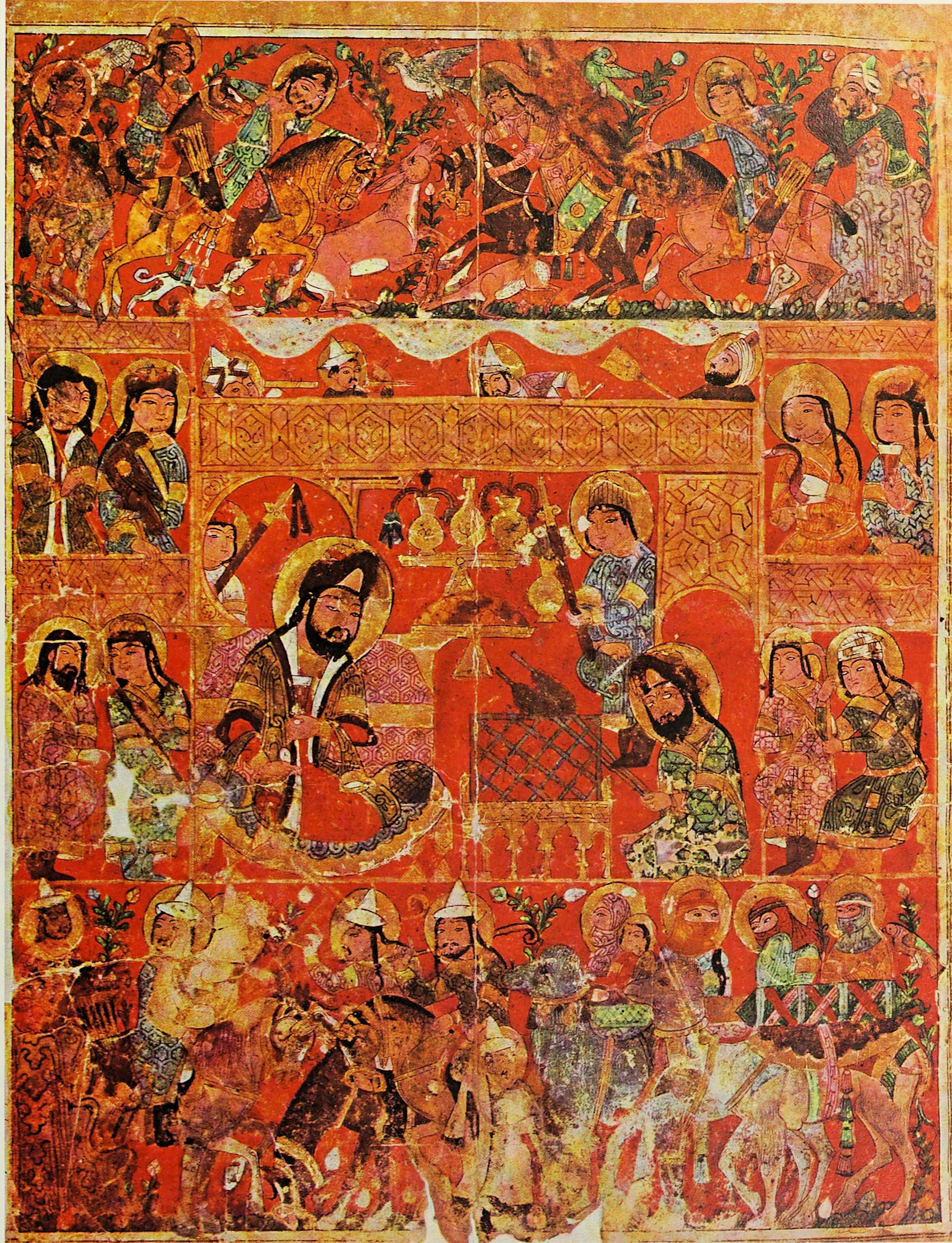
Scenes of the royal court. Probably northern Iraq (Mosul). Mid 13th century. Book of Antidotes of Pseudo-Galen (Kitāb al-Diryāq). "In the paintings the facial cast of these [ruling] Turks is obviously reflected, and so are the special fashions and accoutrements they favored".

This copy, from the second quarter of the 13th century, is thought to have been produced in Mosul. Although there is no mention of a dedication in this edition, the courtly paintings are quite similar to those of the court of Badr al-Din Lu'lu' in the Kitab al-Aghani (1218–1219), and may be related to this ruler.

The frontispiece shows an intricate courtly scene with figured in Turkic dress: a central king resembling Badr al-Din Lu'lu' (wearing a fur-trimmed, patterned qabā' maftūḥ, with elbow-length tirāz sleeves and on his head a sharbush hat), surrounded by numerous attendants (most of them wearing the aqbiya turkiyya Turkic coat and kalawta caps). The courtly scene is framed by equestrian scenes, some of the horse-riders wearing the brimmed hat with conical crown known as sarāqūj. "In the paintings the facial cast of these [ruling] Turks is obviously reflected, and so are the special fashions and accoutrements they favored".

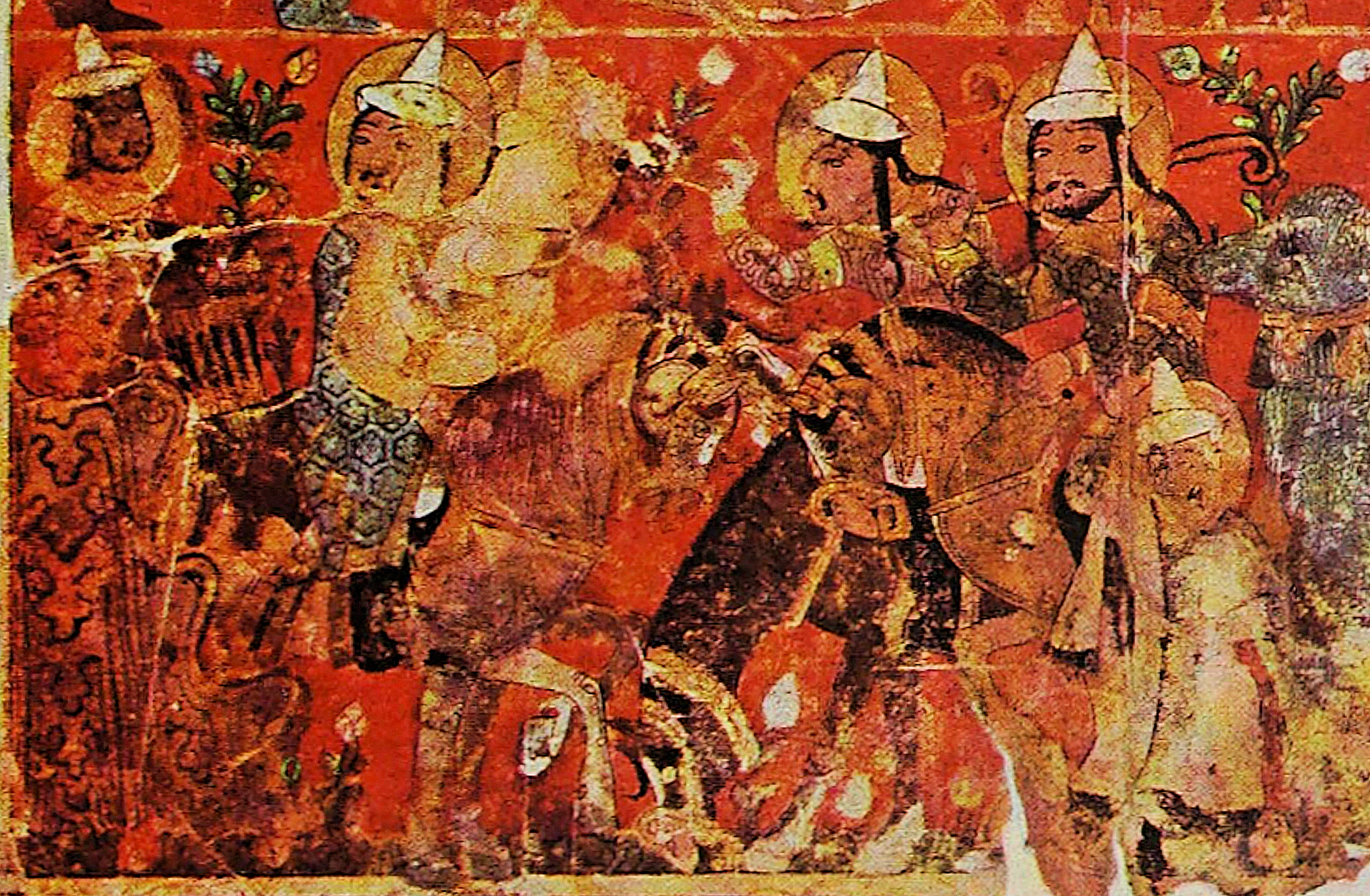
Turkoman soldiers (detail). Book of Antidotes of Pseudo-Galen. Probably northern Iraq (Mosul). Mid 13th century.

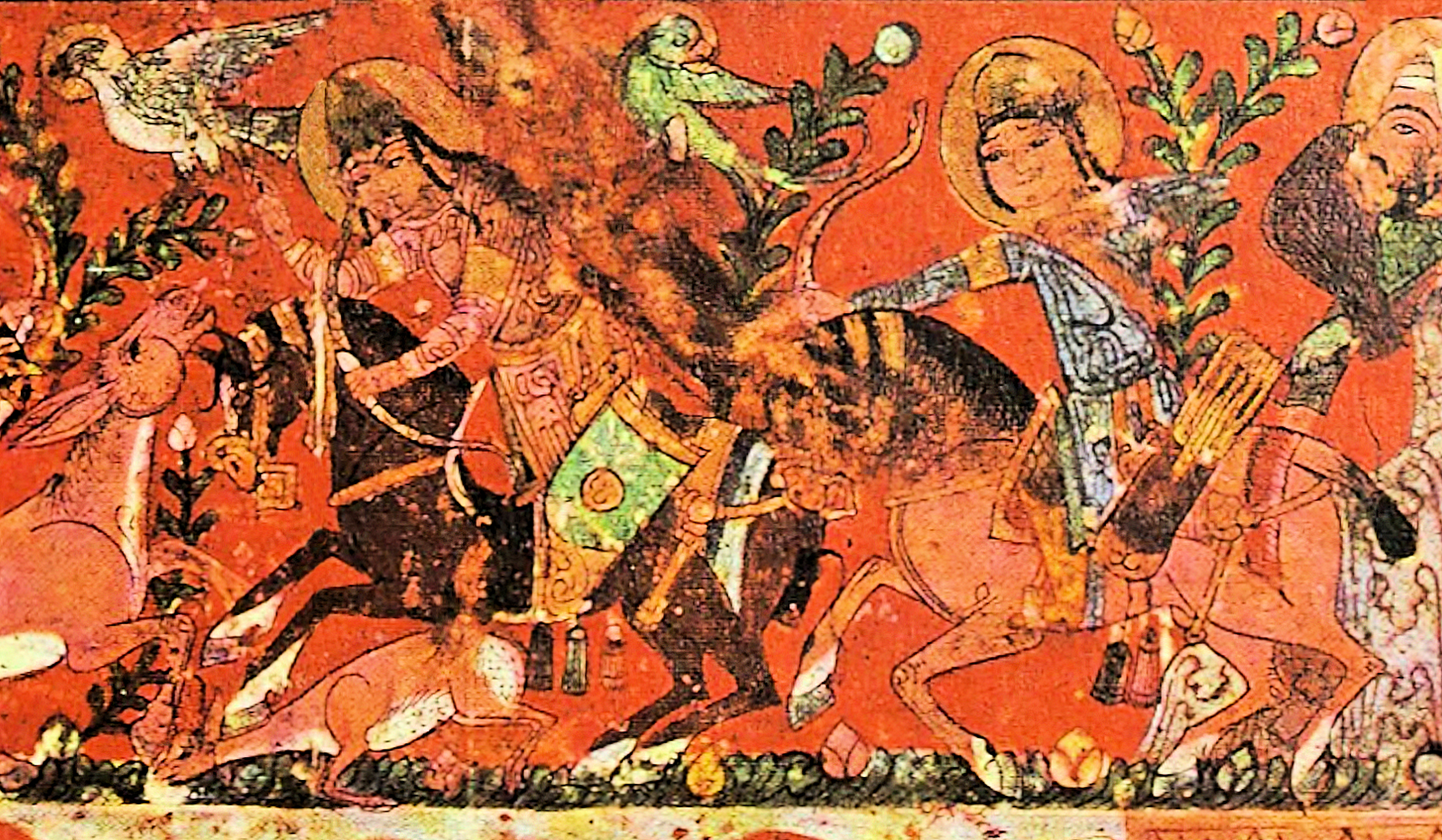
Huntsmen, frontispiece.

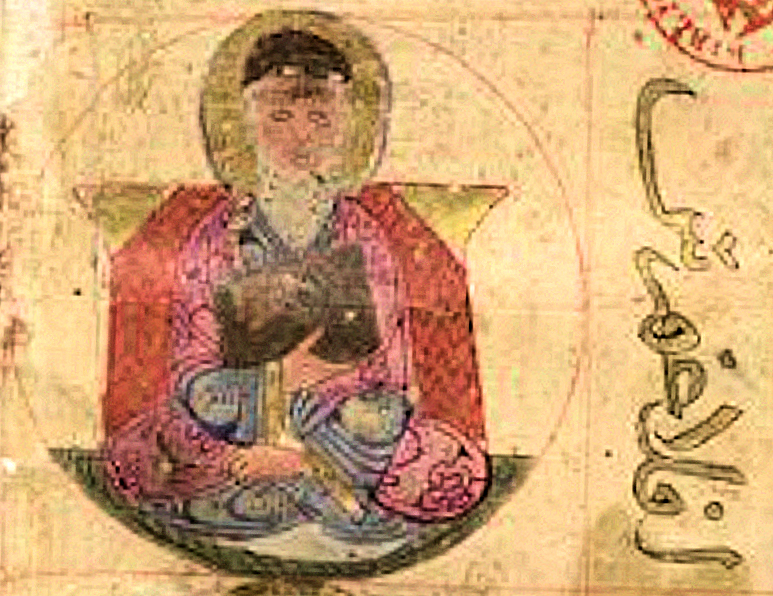
Roman physician Galen (Arabic: جالينوس, romanized: Jalinus) in Kitāb al-Diryāq, 1225×1250, Syria. Vienna AF 10
