= Risālat al-Ṣūfī fī al-kawākib =

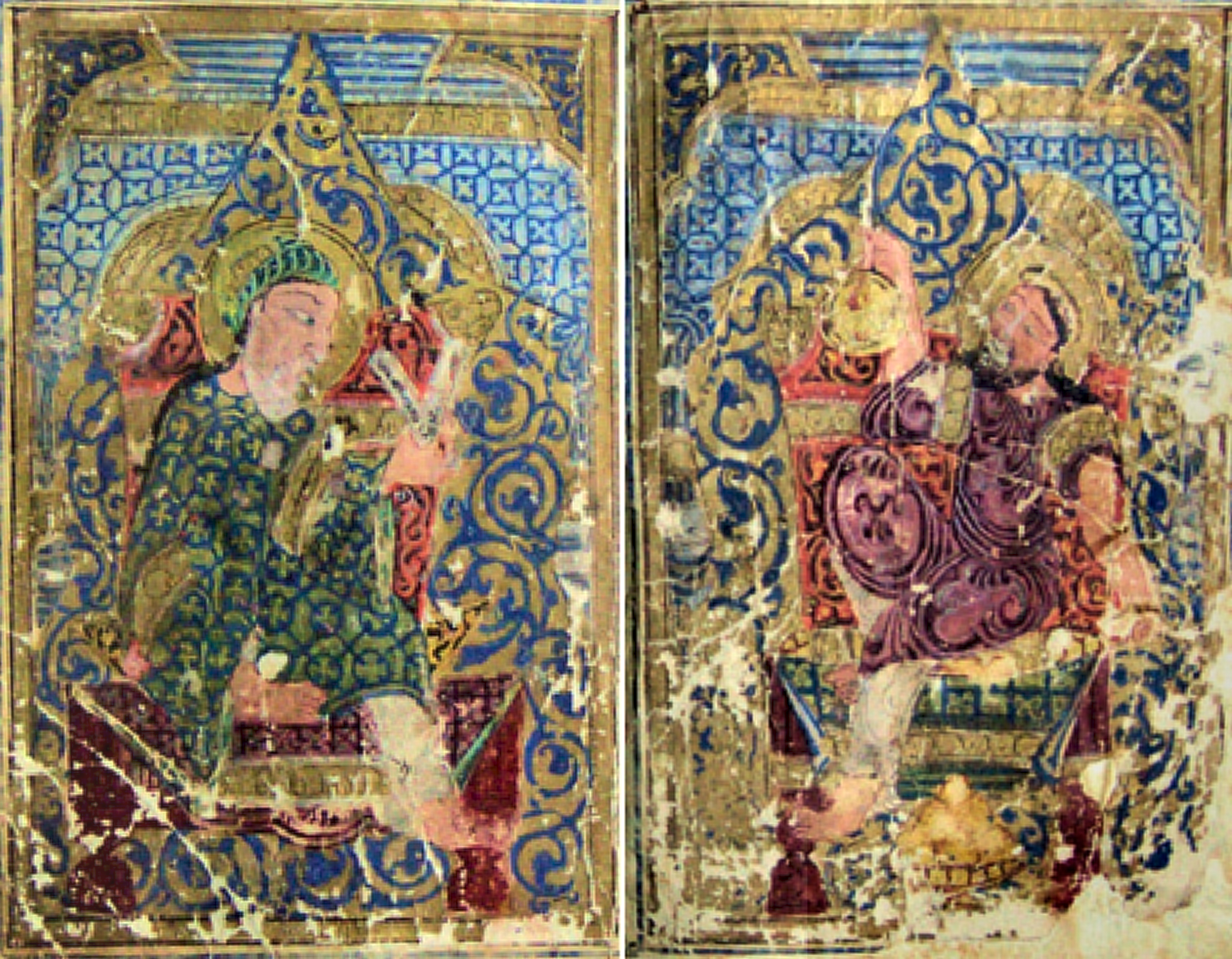
- Old sage with a young prince (Ibn al-Ṣūfī and his patron-prince?), double frontispiece. Ibn al-Ṣūfī, Risālat al-Ṣūfī fī al-kawākib Probably Baghdad, c. 1225. Tehran, Reza Abbasi Museum (RAM), M. 570
- Author: Ibn al-Ṣūfī (or one of his sons)
- Original title: رسالة الصوفي في الكواكب
- Language: Arabic
- Subject: Astronomy
- Genre: Poem
- Published: 10th-11th century
- Publication place: Rayy, Iran
- Media type: Manuscript

Risālat al-Ṣūfī fī al-kawākib (Arabic:رسالة الصوفي في الكواكب, "Epistle of al-Ṣūfī on the Stars"), is an 10-11th-century poem, probably composed in Rayy, Iran. It was authored by Ibn al-Ṣūfī, or most probably one of his sons. It is a poetic supplement to Ibn al-Ṣūfī's astronomical opus The Book of Fixed Stars, in the urjūza genre.

The text is known from a 13th century manuscript, possibly composed in Baghdad, now in Tehran, Reza Abbasi Museum (RAM M. 570), also called "RAM al'Sufi". It is stylistically dated to circa 1225. An inscription in the manuscript gives a date of AH 554 (1159 CE), but this is probably a later interpolation.

The manuscript has various depictions of the constellations, using various human and animal figures. Several of the figures are wearing Turkic clothing, such as Centaurus, who has a Turkic sharbush headgear.

Another Qajar copy exists, dated ̣to 1894 (Tehran, Majlis Library, no. 5099).

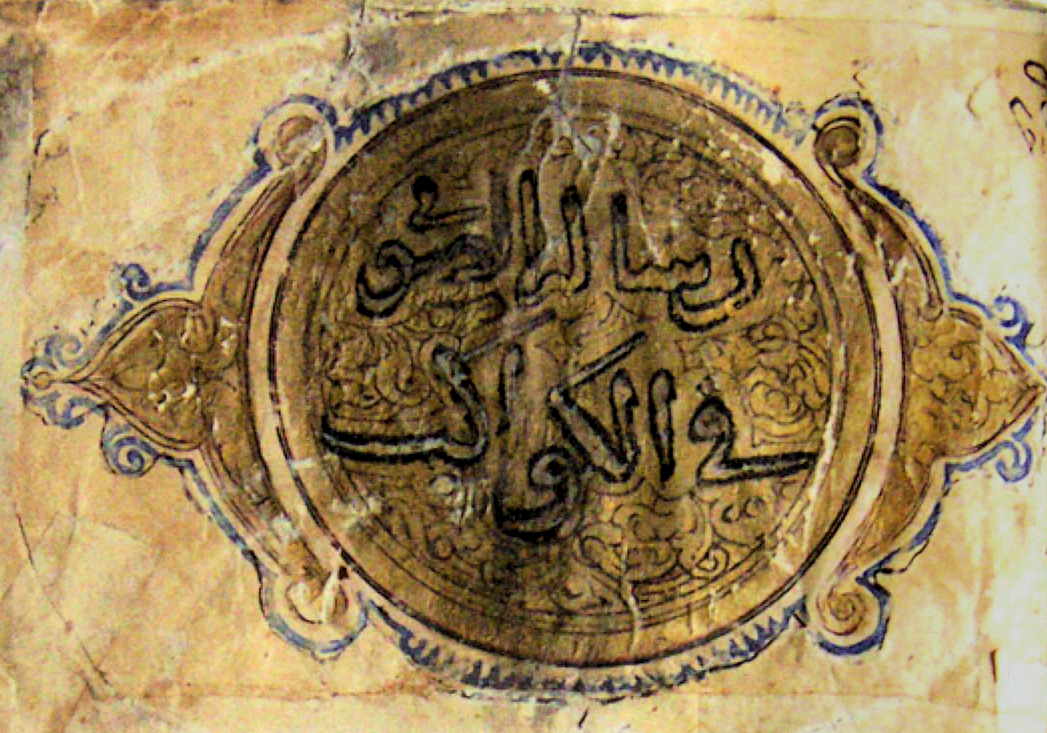
Title of Risālat al-Ṣūfī fī al-kawākib

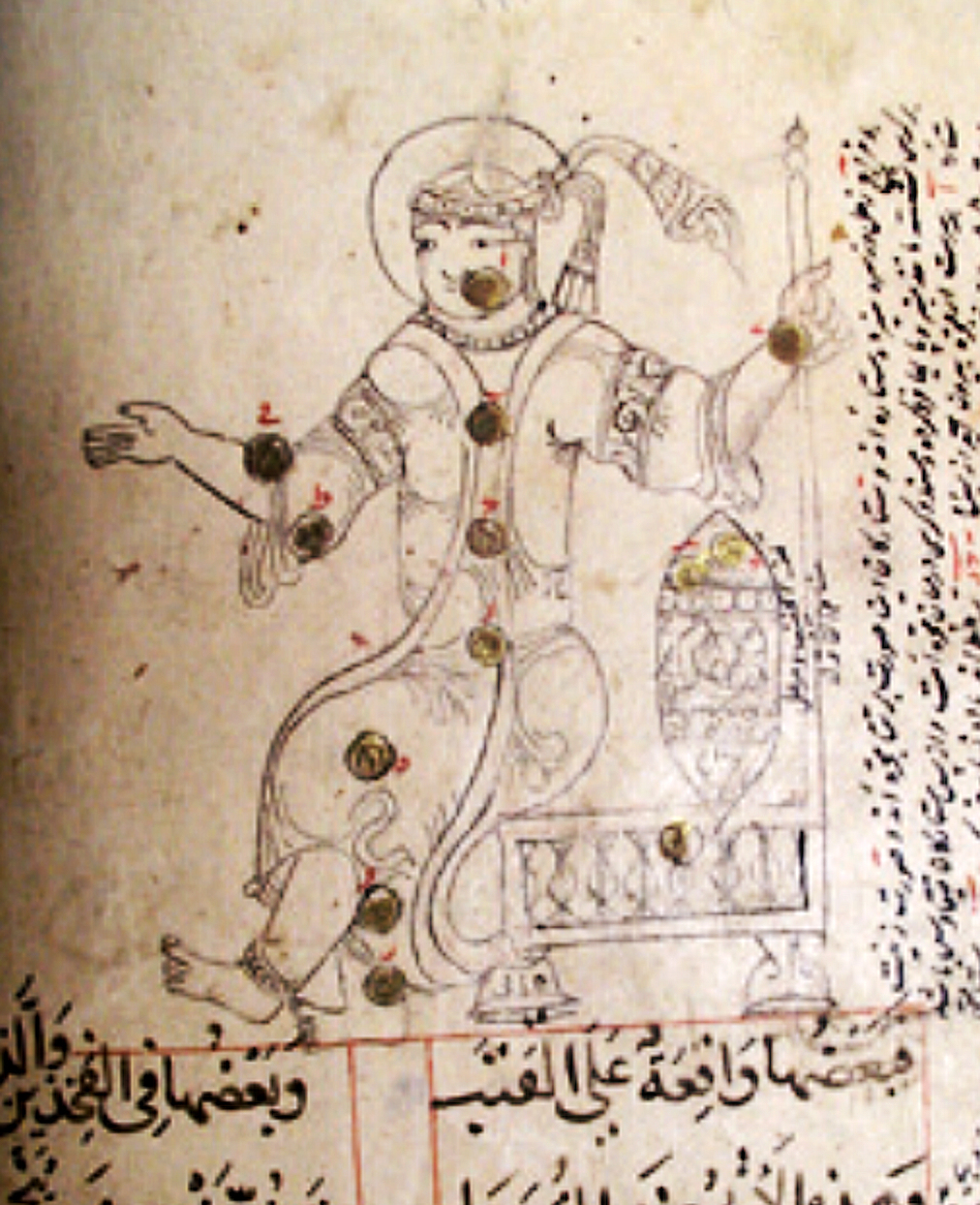
Cassiopeia. Ibn al-Ṣūfī, p. 24

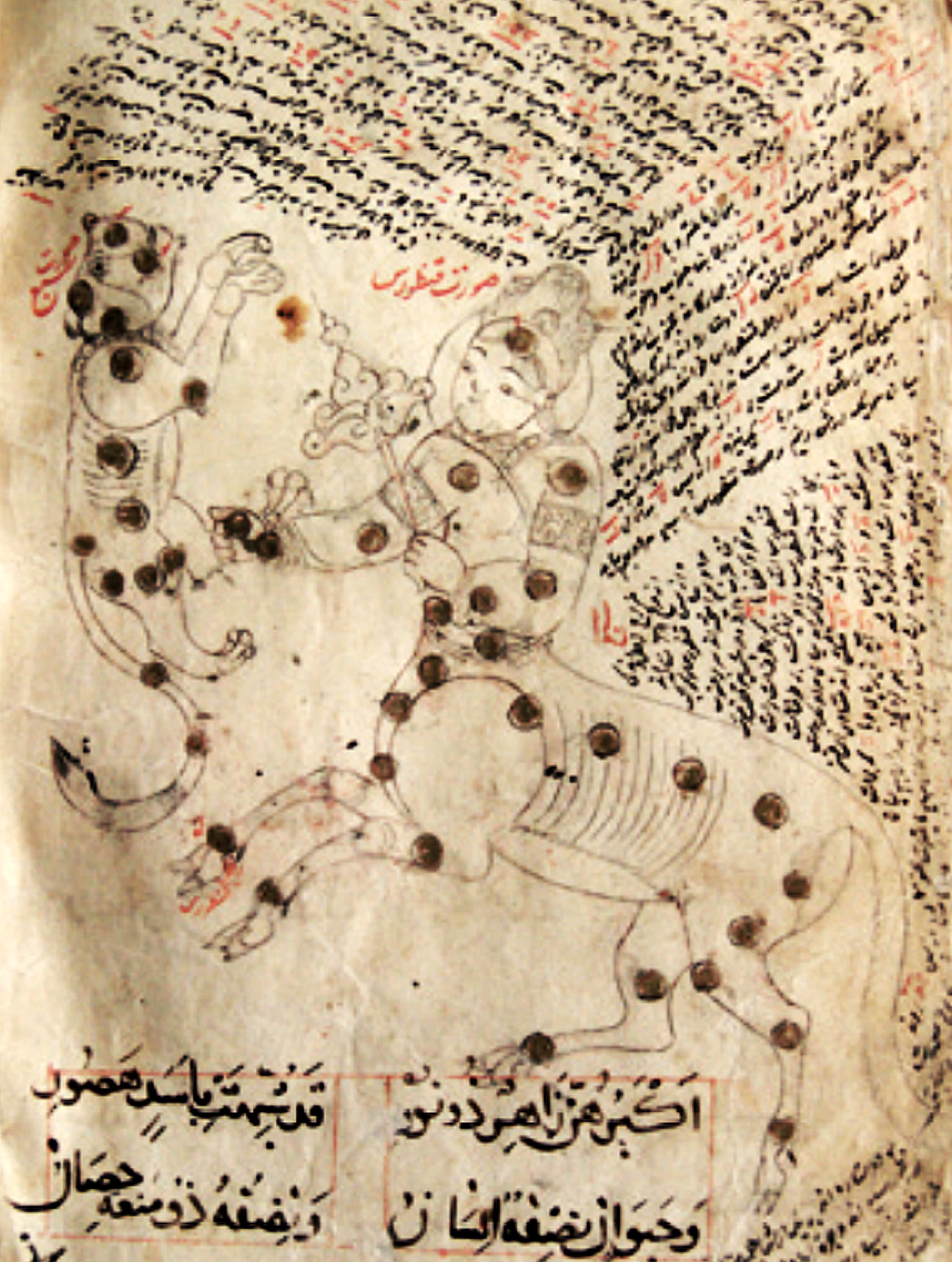
Centaurus and Lupus. Ibn al-Ṣūfī, p. 72. Centaurus has a Turkic sharbush headgear.

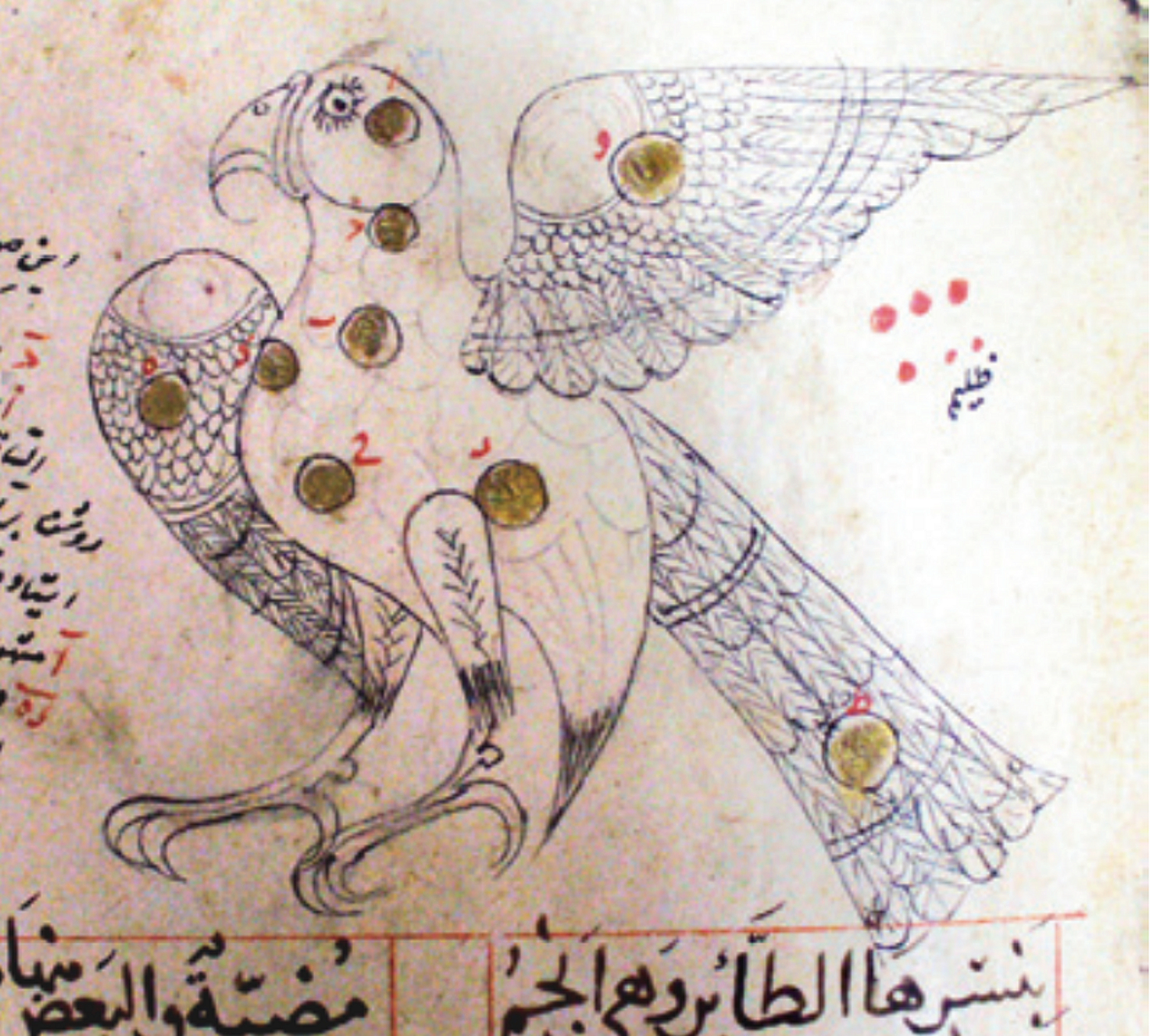
Aquila. Ibn al-Ṣūfī, p. 31

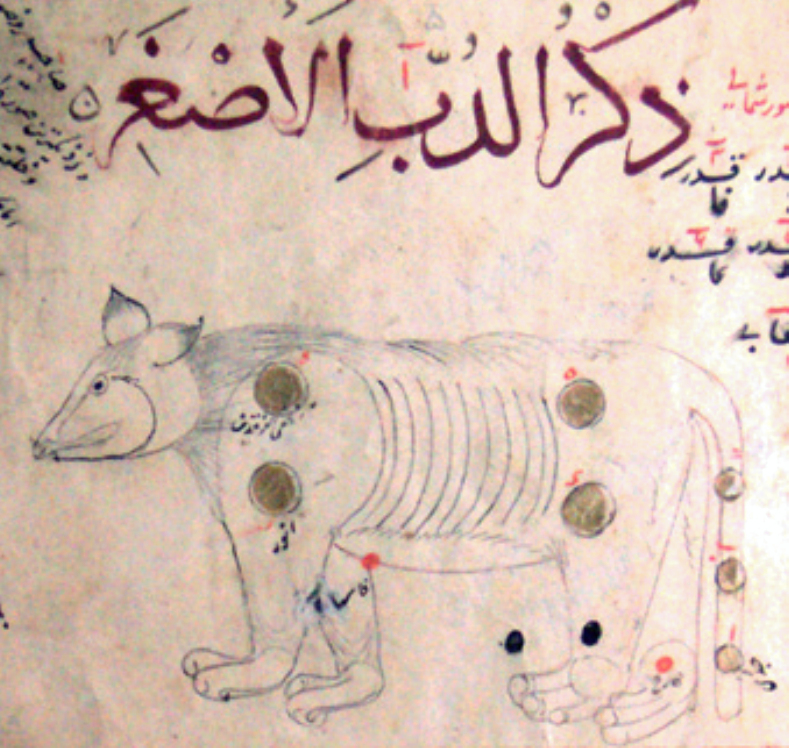
Ursa Minor. Ibn al-Ṣūfī, p. 5

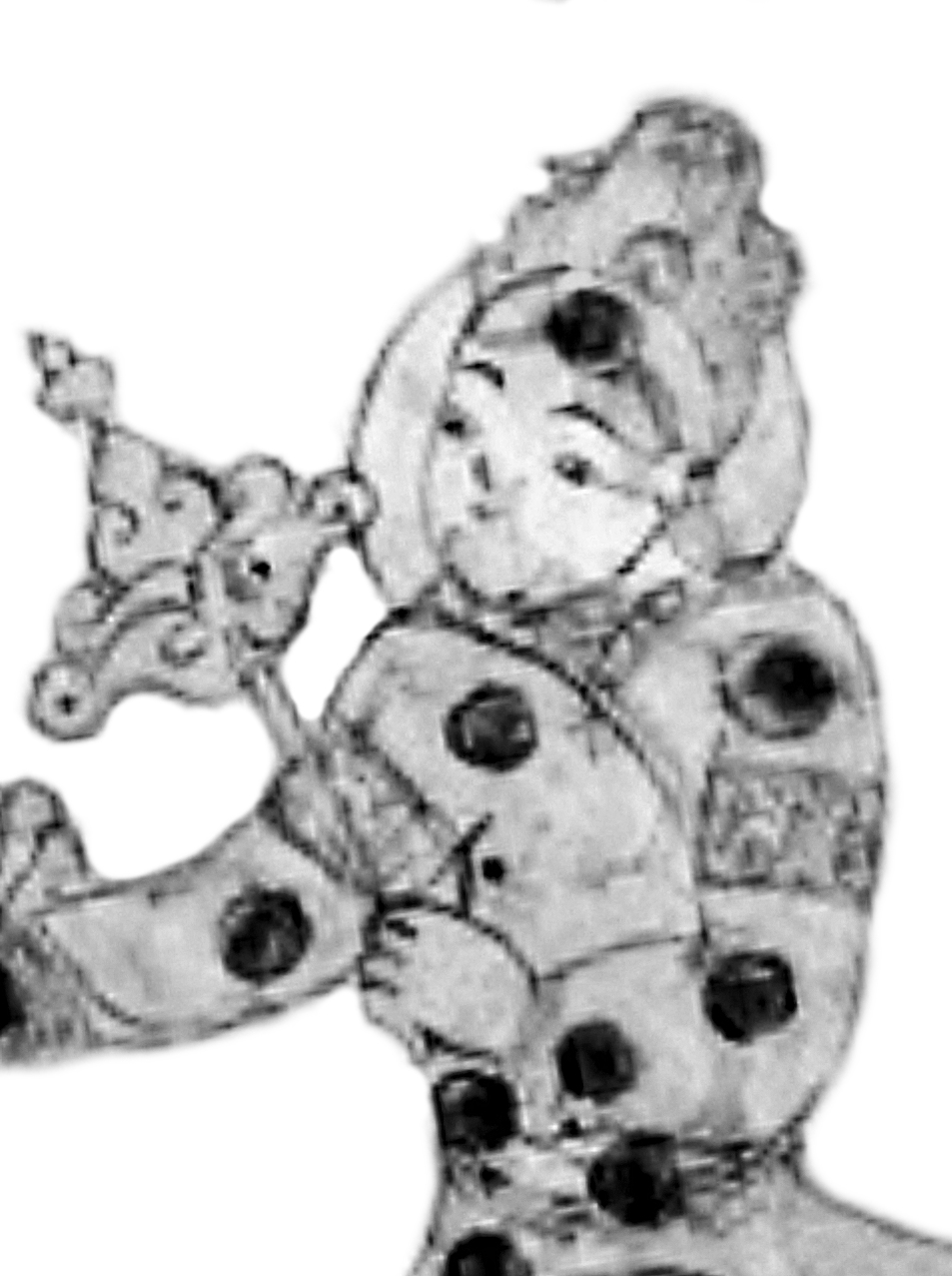
Centaurus (detail) with a Turkic sharbush headgear and clothing.

== Sources ==
- Contadini, Anna (1 January 2012). A World of Beasts: A Thirteenth-Century Illustrated Arabic Book on Animals (the Kitāb Na‘t al-Ḥayawān) in the Ibn Bakhtīshū‘ Tradition. Brill. doi:10.1163/9789004222656_005.
- Contadini, Anna (2006). "A Question in Arab Painting: The Ibn Al-Sufi Manuscript in Tehran and Its Art-Historical Connections". Muqarnas. 23: 47–84. ISSN 0732-2992.
