= Palmer Cup =

1200-1215 CE goblet from northern Syria or Jazira

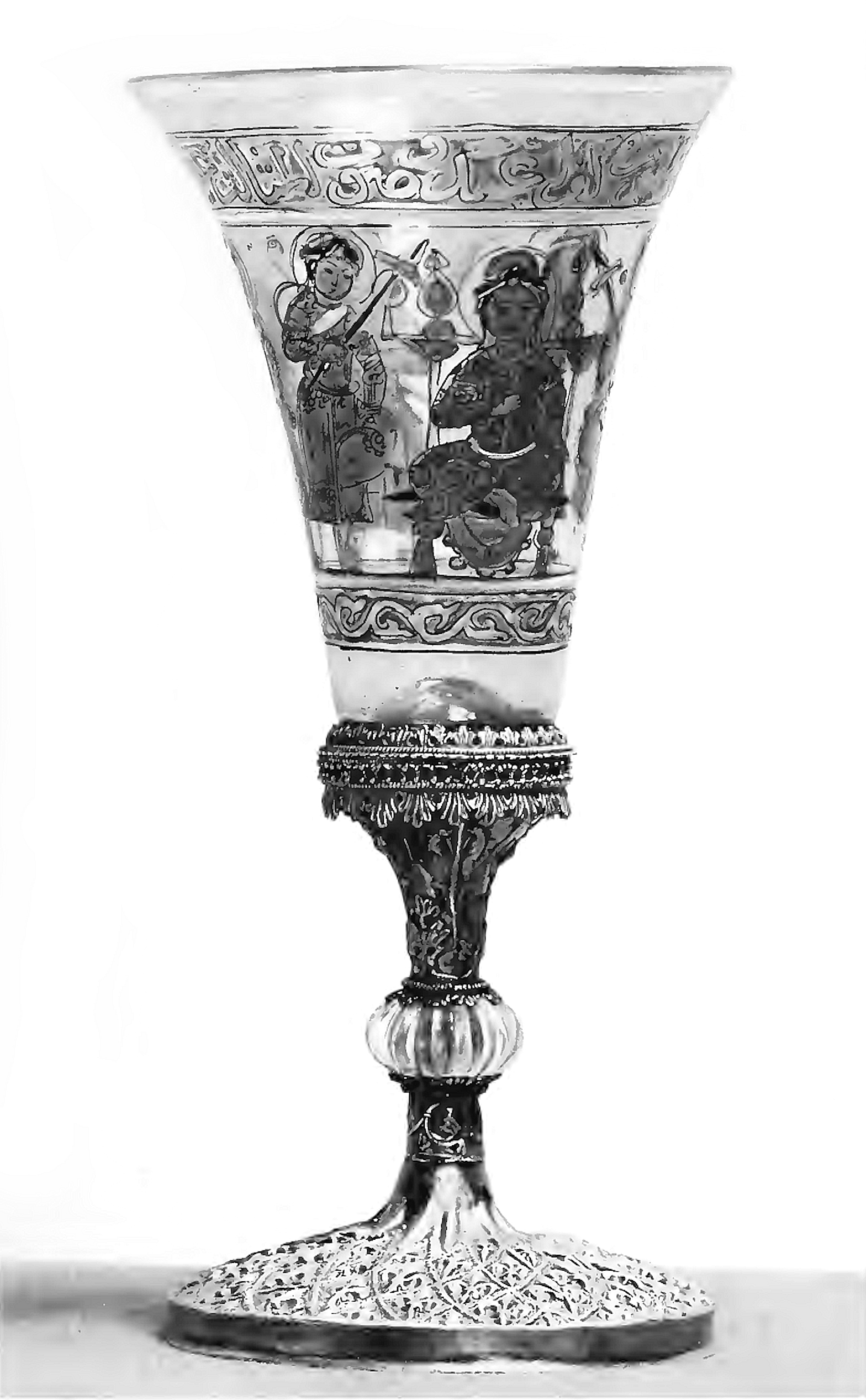
Palmer Cup (British Museum)

The Palmer Cup is a 1200–1215 CE goblet from northern Syria or Jazira, and an example of early Islamic glass. It is sometimes described as "Ayyubid", since it corresponds to the time when the Ayyubids disputed control of areas of Northern Mesopotamia with the Zengids and Artuqids, but it belongs artistically to the Northern Mesopotamia region, somewhere between northern Syria and the Jazira. It is now in the British Museum, as part of the Waddesdon Bequest (Room 2A (Case 6b).

== Inscription ==
The goblet is made of clear glass, enamelled and gilt, mounted on a foot of silver gilt embossed with fleurs-de-lis. Near the edge, an inscription appears in gold on a blue ground: the line can be traced to the poet Kushajim (died around 961), and reads:

"Repent! While the cup is in the hand of the beardless youth, and the sound of the second and third [strings of the lute] is loud!"

== Depiction of a prince and his attendants ==
Below the inscription, a prince is seated between two attendants holding swords; beyond are three other attendants, including one holding a polo club. The figures are modelled in a thick white enamel, thinly gilt and having details in red and blue. The goblet has a flat foot-rim with a turn up inside. It is held in the mount by leaves; the stem is embossed with pairs of birds sitting on branches; ribbed crystal knop; the base is embossed with fleurs-de-lis in lozenge diaper. The goblet has a height of 10.6 in (270 mm).

== Glass from Mosul, Damascus, or Egypt ==
The original object was a glass beaker, transformed into a goblet with an elongated stem in France. The glass is Islamic work, perhaps made at Mosul, Damascus, or in Egypt, in the early thirteenth century. The decorated glass beaker itself can be securely attributed to the Jazira area of northern Iraq and northern Syria, probably to Raqqa or Aleppo, where major glass workshops operated, and can be most likely dated to the period between 1200 and 1225.

== Chalice from Paris ==
The mount is a silver-gilt chalice in filigree with a rock-crystal bead in the middle of the stem, and is most likely made in Paris, France, in the late 1250s or early 1260s. This cup was long in the possession of the Palmer family, of Ladbroke in Warwickshire.

== Fashion-style from Mosul ==
The ruler and attendants are similar to those found in the manuscript Kitab al-Dariyaq from the Mosul or North Jazira area, and wear the typical sharbush type of headgear. Their robes, headgear, attitudes are also similar to metalwork objects datable to the early 13th century with a provenance from Mosul or the Northern Jazira area.

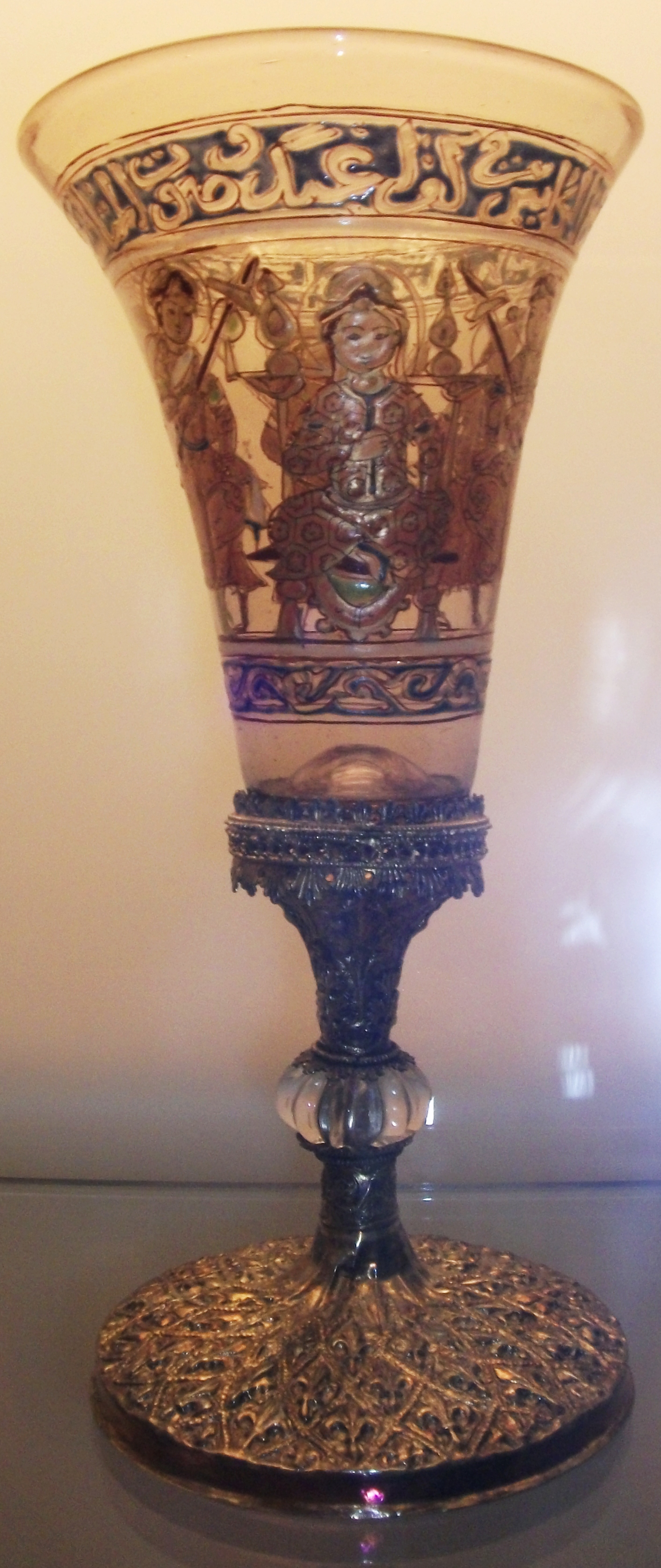
The cup in the British Museum

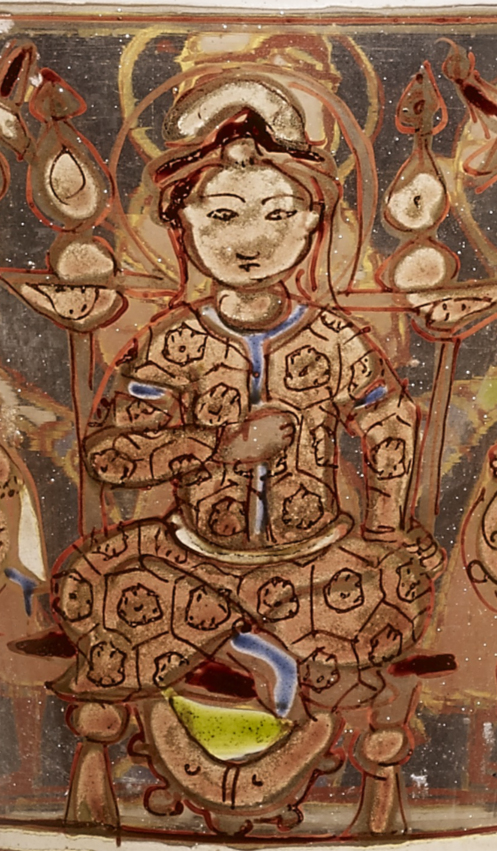
Seated ruler

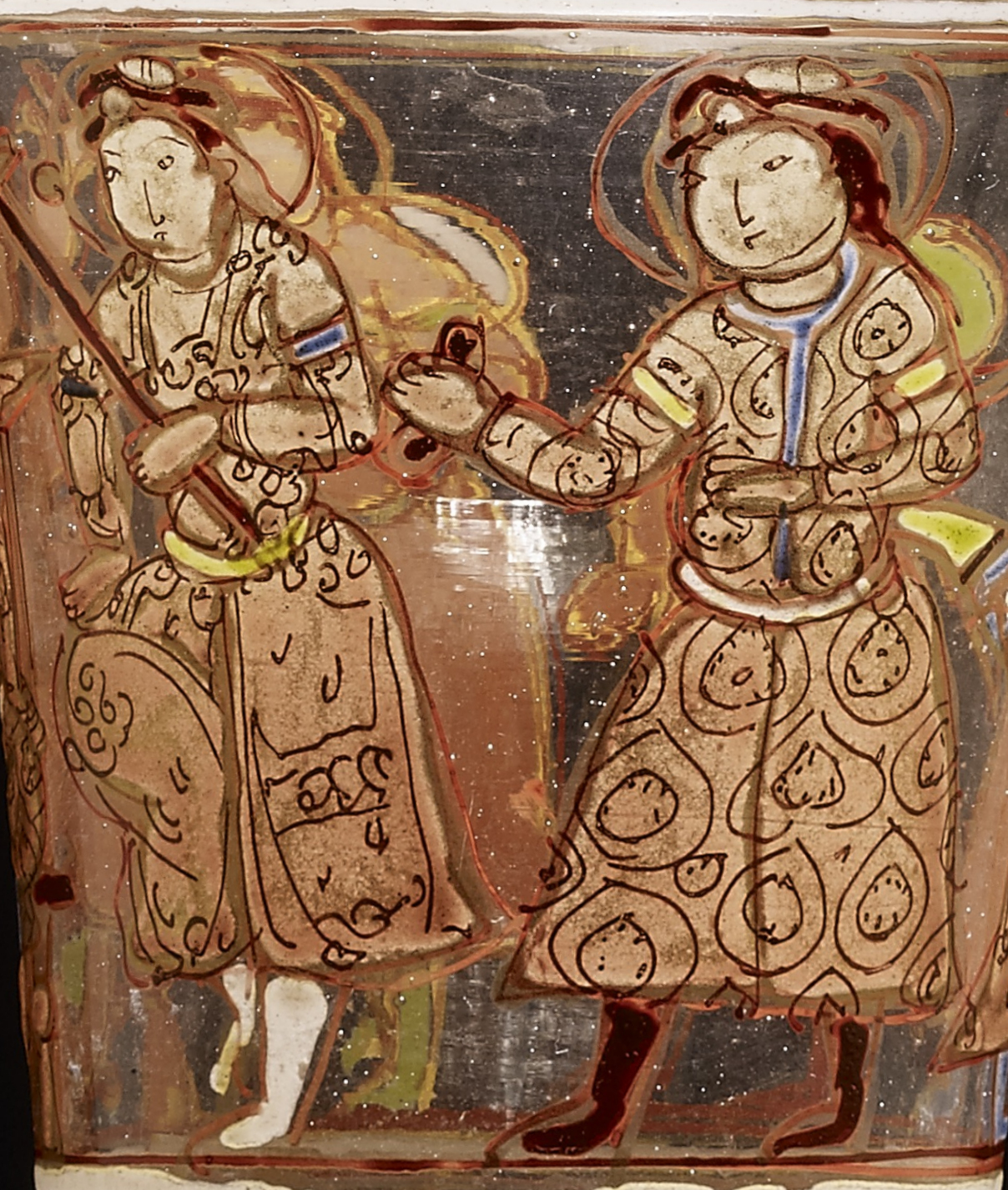
Palmer Cup, right attendants

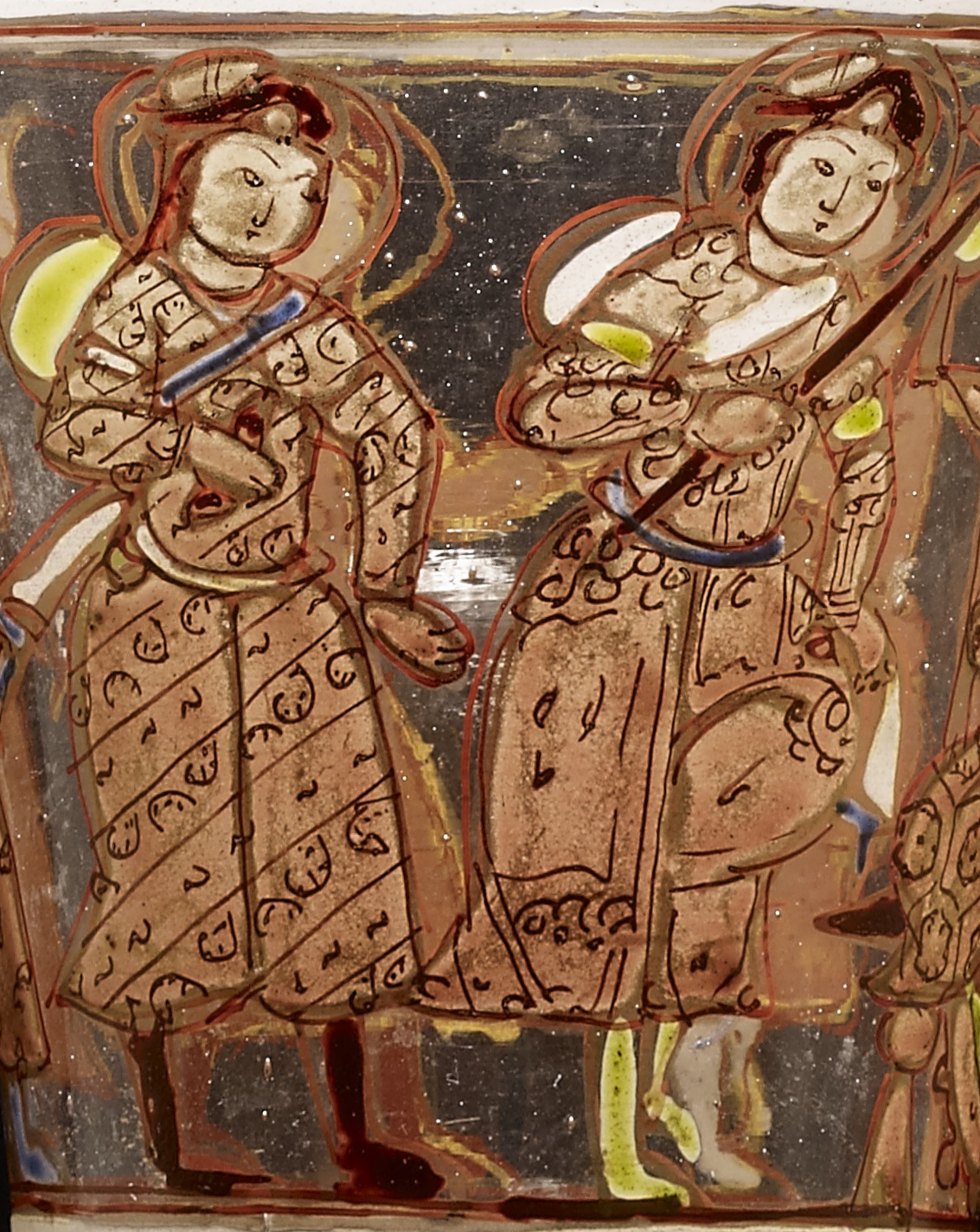
Palmer Cup, left attendants

== Sources ==
- Read, Charles Hercules (1902). The Waddesdon Bequest. Catalogue of the Works of Art Bequeathed to the British Museum by Baron Ferdinand Rothschild, M.P., 1898 (PDF). London: British Museum. This article incorporates text by Read available under the CC0 license.
