= Saraquj =

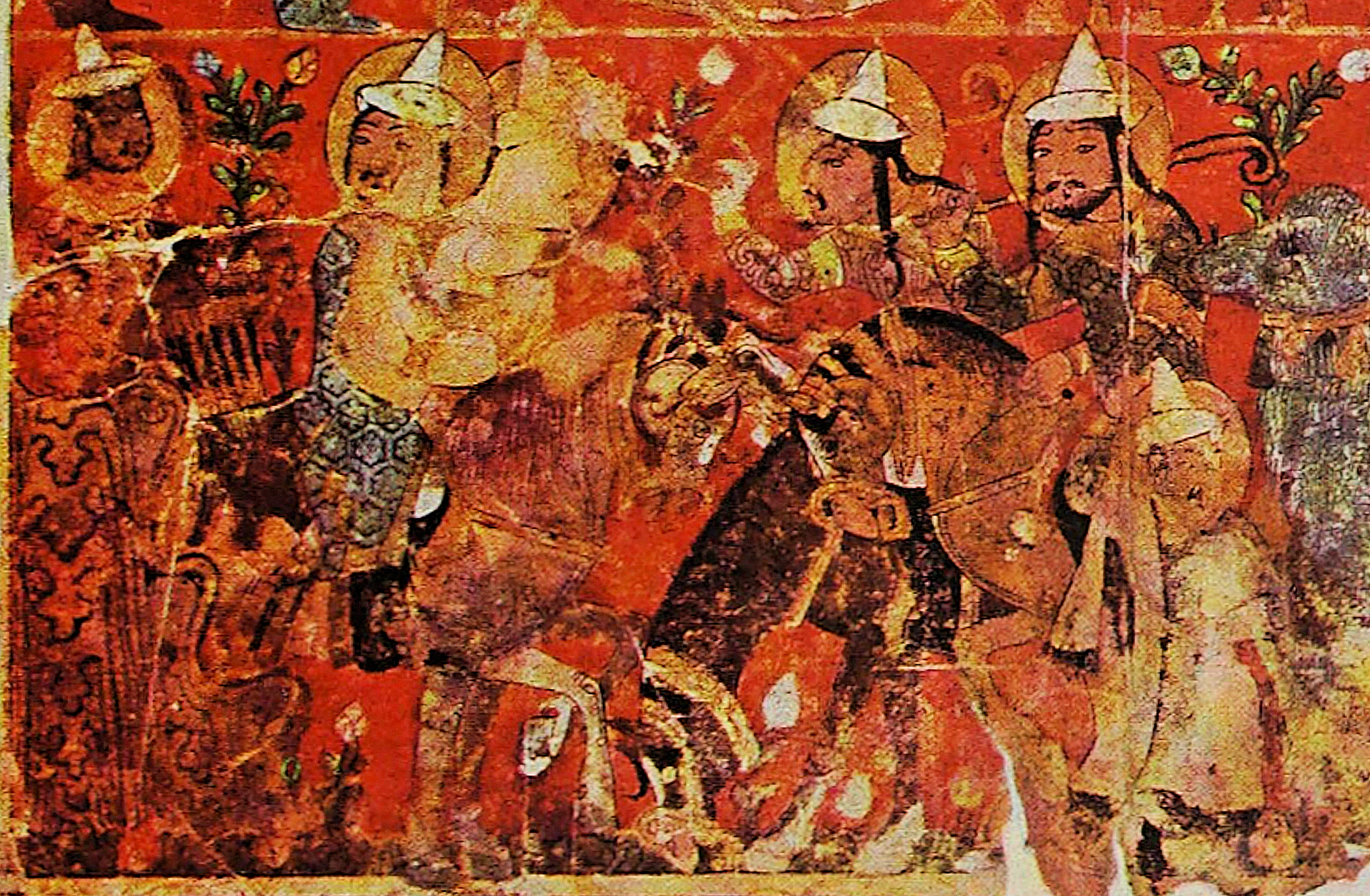
Turkoman soldiers (detail), wearing the sarāqūj for a game of polo. Kitāb al-Diryāq ("Book of Antidotes of Pseudo-Galen"). Probably northern Iraq (Mosul). Mid 13th century.

The sarāqūj was a type of conical hat with a brimmed base, worn by Central Asian men during the time of Turkic rule in the Middle-East and Central Asia in the 12th-14th centuries CE. It was usually white or cream-colored. It could be decorated with crisscrossed colored takhfīfa, set in place with a brooch or plaquette.

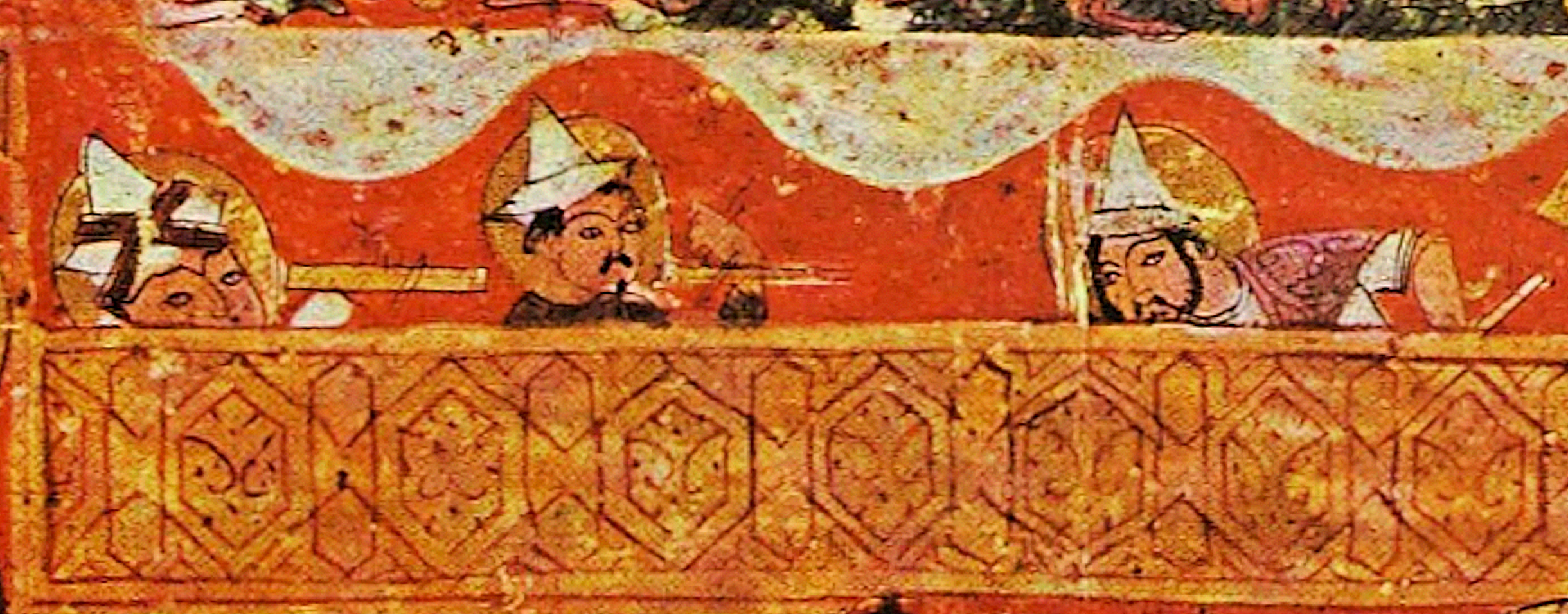
Workers wearing the Saraquj. Probably northern Iraq (Mosul). Mid 13th century

== See also ==
- Sharbush
- List of hat styles
