= Sharbush =

Medieval military hat

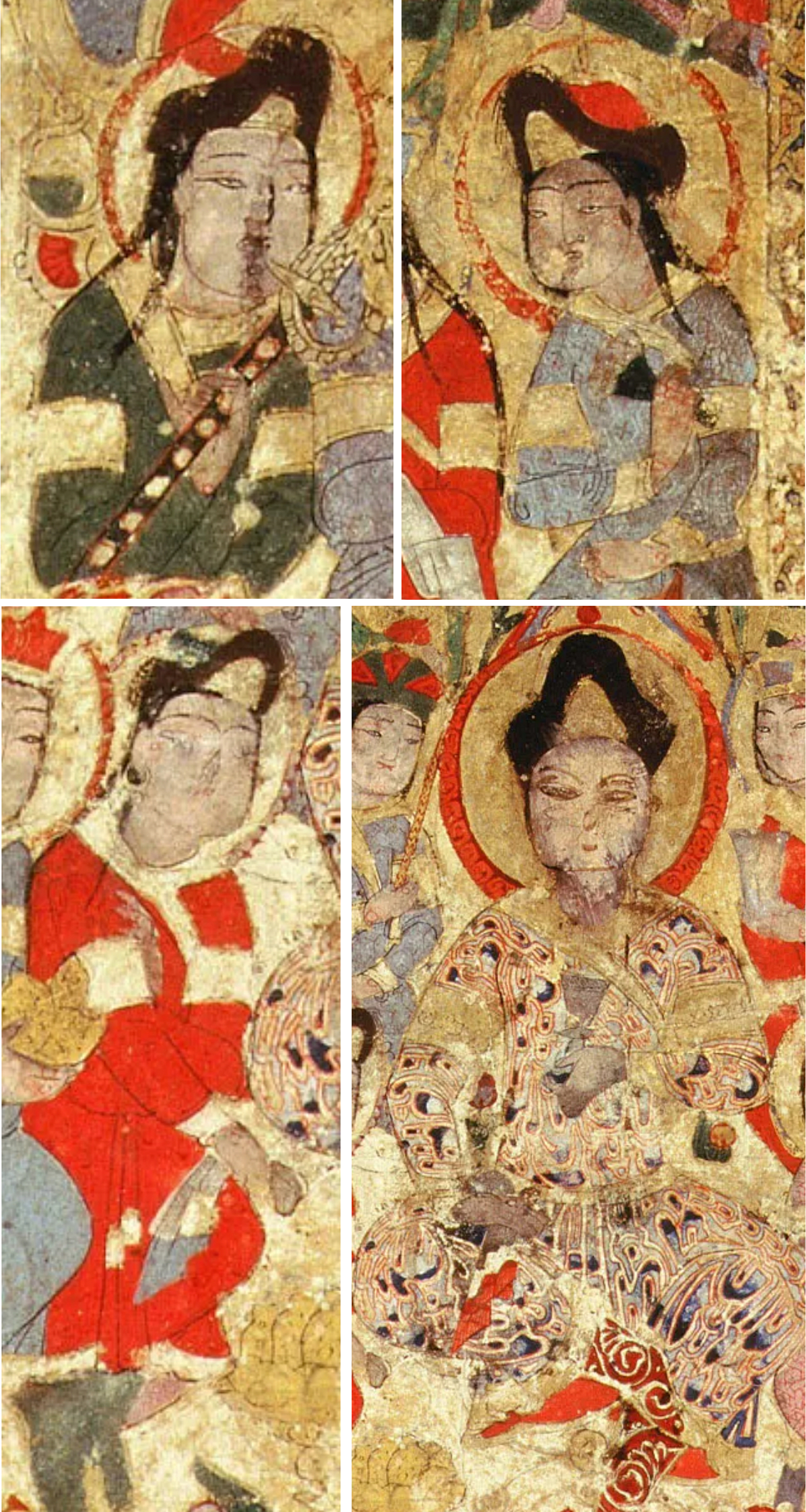
Individuals in Turkic dress, wearing the Sharbush at the court of Badr al-Din Lu'Lu' (Kitab al-Aghani, 1219 CE)

The Sharbush or Harbush, Sarposh, Serpush (Arabic: شَربوش, romanized: sharbūsh, Greek: σαρπούζιν, Turkish: Serpuş) probably derived from the Persian word Sarpush, which means "headdress". was a special Turkic military furred hat worn in Central Asia and the Middle East in the Middle Ages. It appears prominently in the miniatures depicting Badr al-Din Lu'lu' (ruled 1234–1259). It was a stiff cap of the military class, with a triangular front which was sometimes adorned with a metal plaque. It was sometimes supplemented with a small kerchief which formed a small turban, named takhfifa. The wearing of the Sharbūsh was one of the key graphical and sartorial elements to differentiate Turkic figures from Arab ones in medieval Middle-Eastern miniatures.

The Sharbush could vary in size and shape, sometimes taking huge proportions, as in the depiction of the emir in the frontispiece of the 1237 Maqamat of al-Hariri. The shape of the sharbush seems to have varied depending on geographical regions:

- The sharbush of Artuqid manuscripts (example) has a very tall cap behind the headplate and the usage of fur around the rim is limited;
- The Seljuk sharbush as seen on Persian ceramics, or on objects from Mosul such as the Blacas ewer, or in Jazira and Syria manuscripts had a much lower cap, almost hidden behind the band of fur surrounding the head and the frontal plate;
- The frontispiece of the Baghdad Schefer Maqamat shows another sharbush, consisting of a tall mass of fur, hiding the cap from view.

The sharbush headgear was a rallying sign for Saladin, and he wore it on his Mayyafariqin coinage. When Henry II, Count of Champagne, king of Jerusalem, tried to build a friendly relationship with Saladin, he requested the gift of a qabā robe and a sharbūsh hat, which he wore in Acre.

The Sharbush was also a symbol of investitute under the Egyptian Mamluks, as it was part of the khil'a given to an amir on the occasion of his accession. The sharbush was worn by high-ranking officers of the Ayyubid and Bahri Mamluk period.

In Mamluk Egypt, the wearing of the Sharbush was banned in 1382.

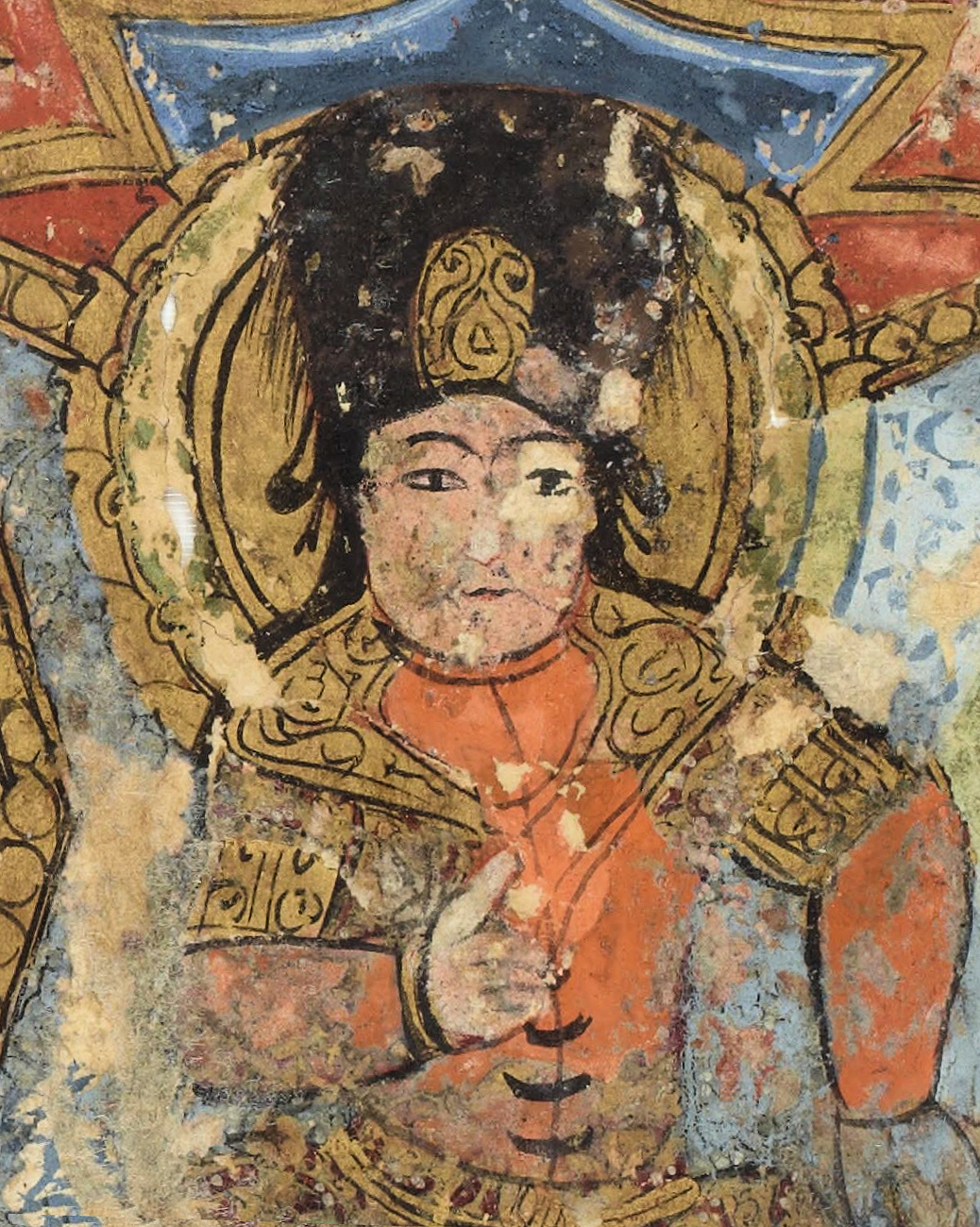
Right frontispiece: ruler in Turkic dress (long braids, large Sharbush fur hat, boots, fitting coat), in the Maqamat of al-Hariri, 1237 CE, probably Baghdad.

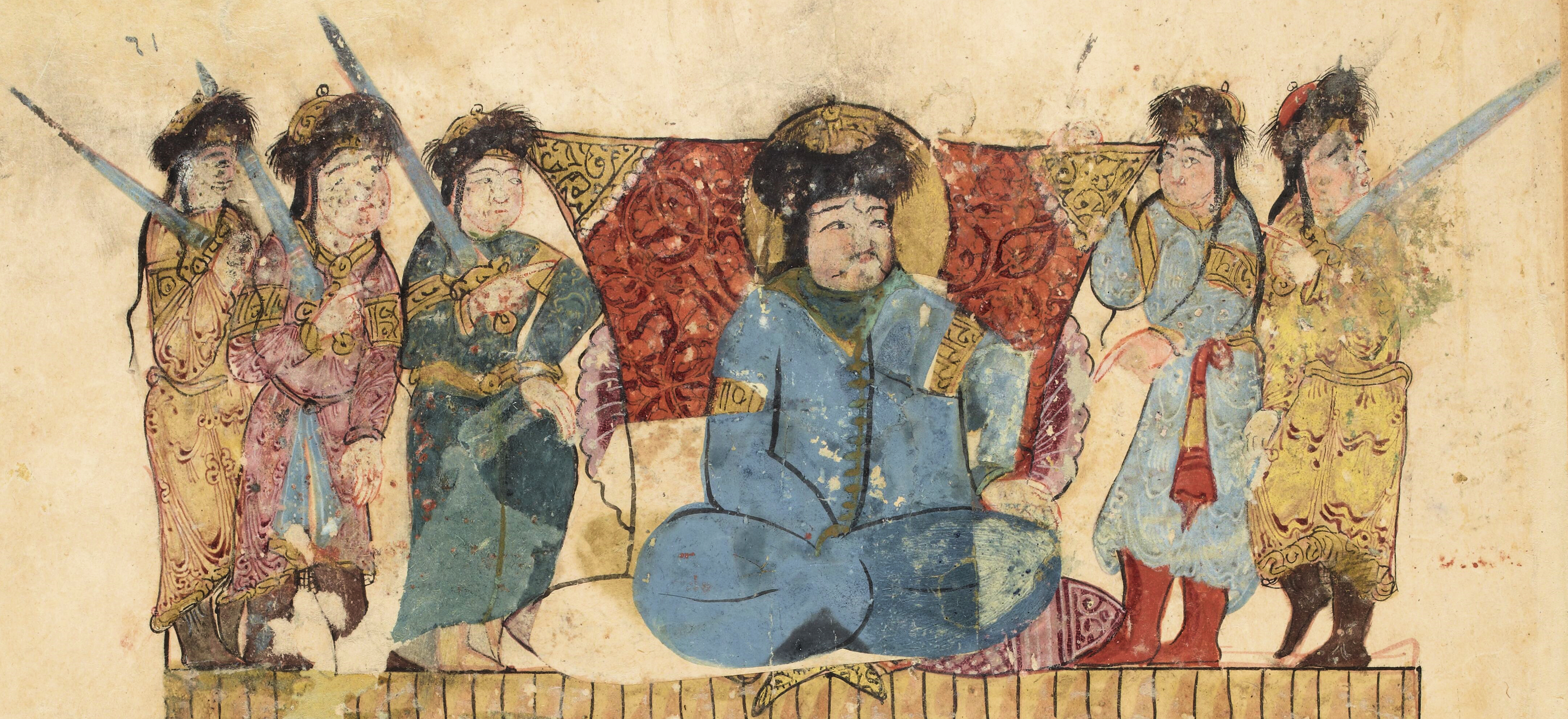
Turkic amir with guards, wearing the Turkic headgear Sharbush, in the preaching scene at Rayy in maqāma 21 (fols. 58v–59r), Maqamat of al-Hariri, 1237.

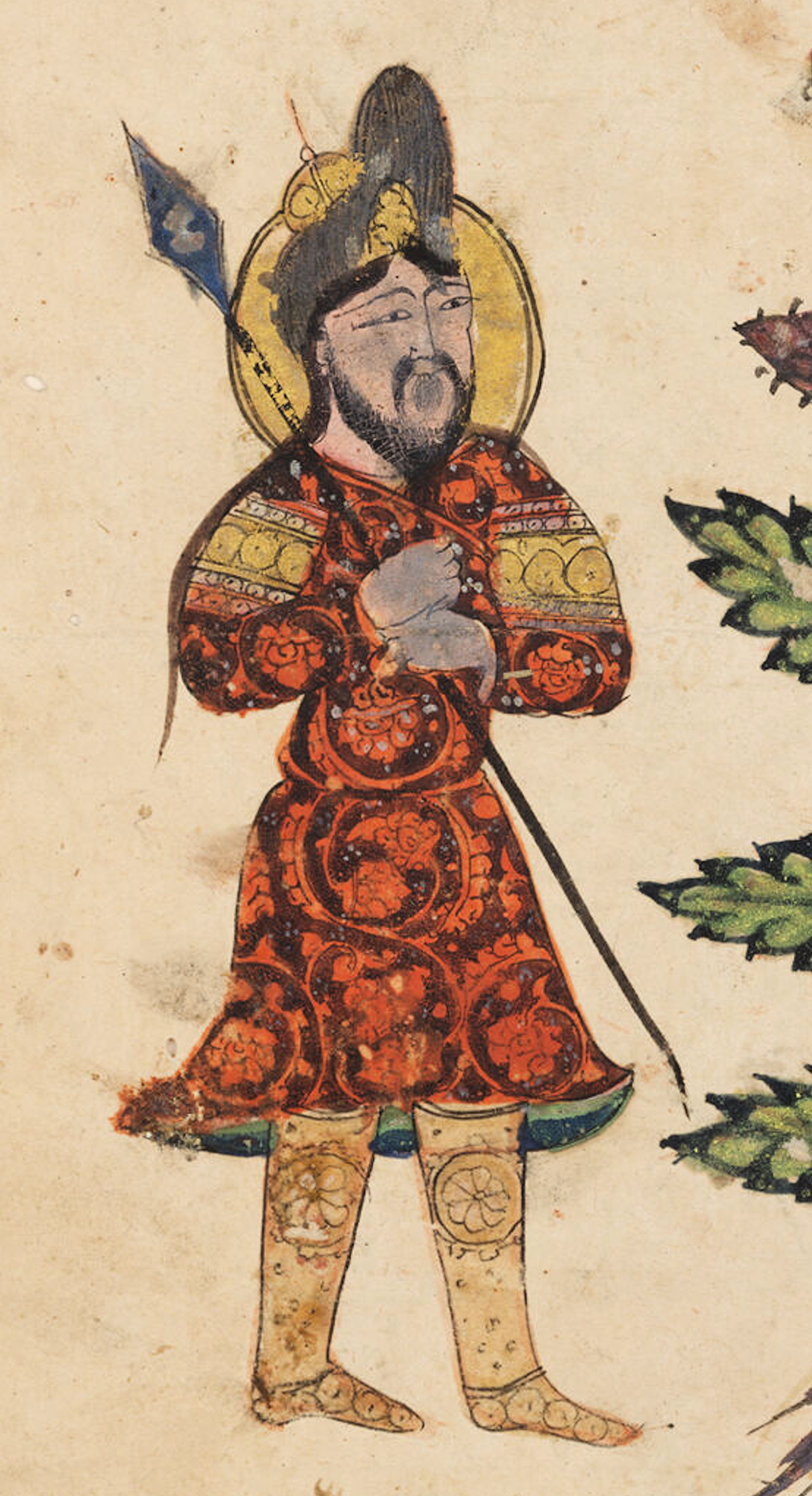
Warrior in Turkic attire, wearing the Turkic headgear sharbush, De Materia Medica of Dioscorides, Iraq, 1224. Harvard Art Museums.

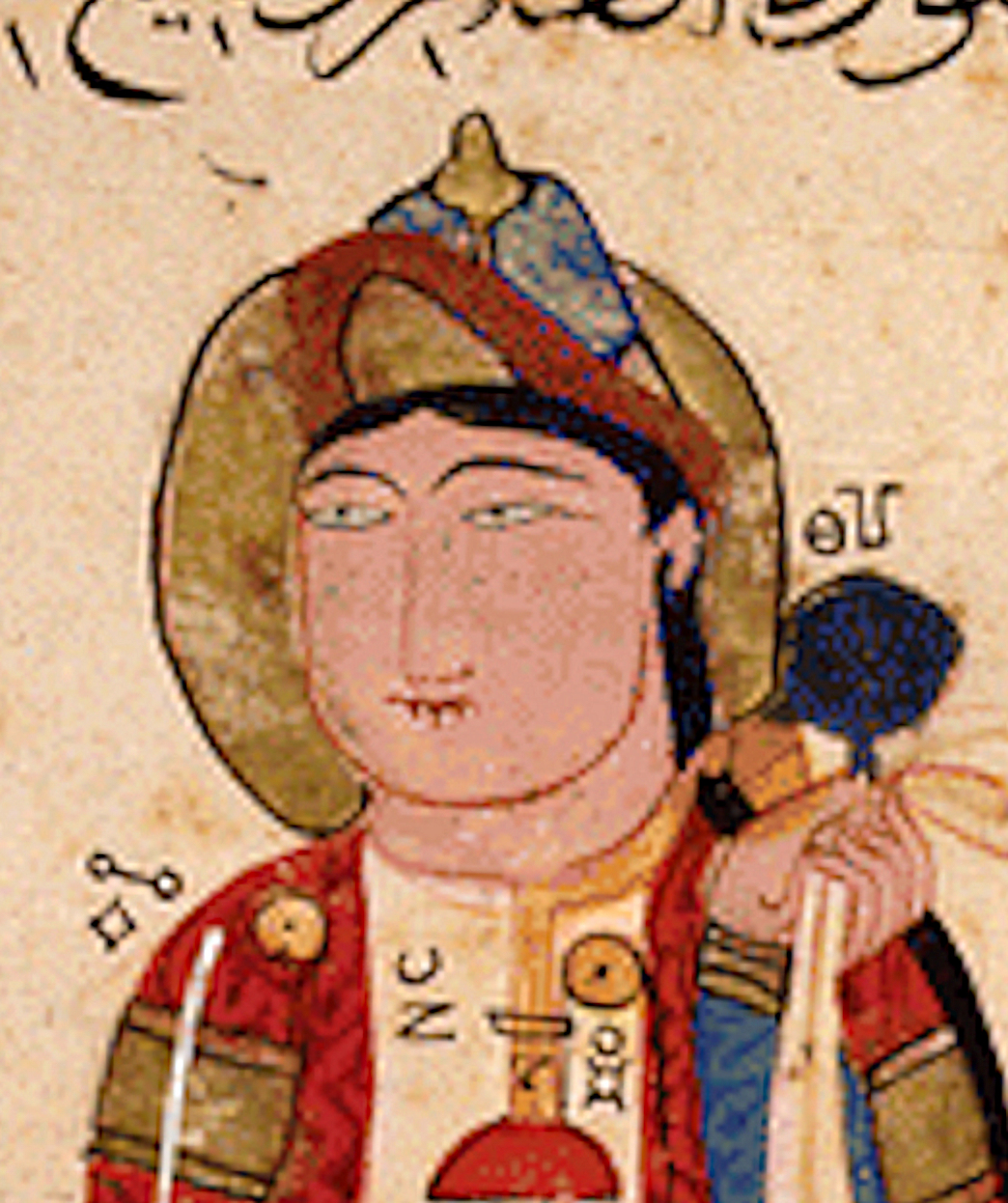
Artuqid sharbush, 1206 (Ms. Ahmet III 3472)

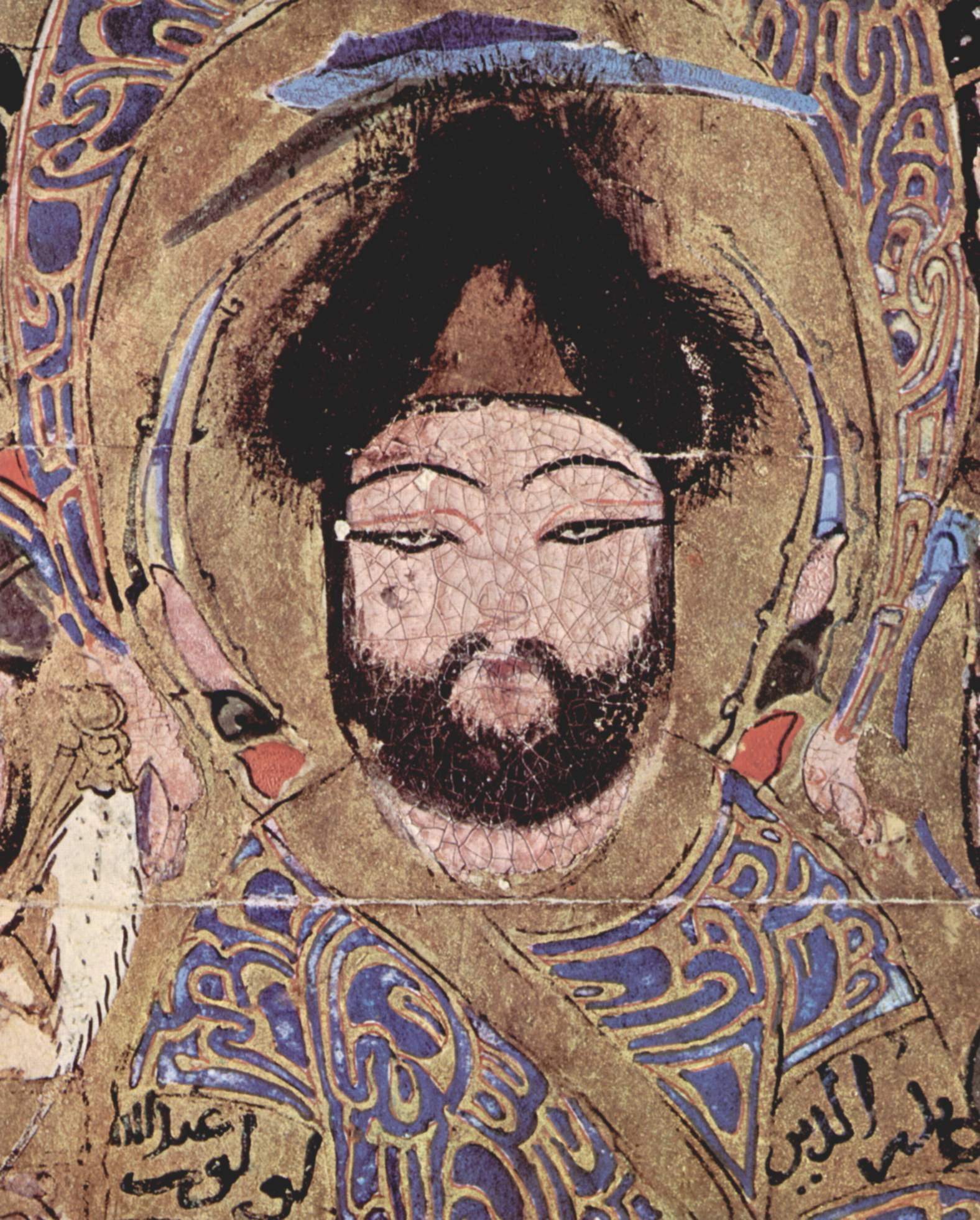
Sharbush of Badr al-Din Lu'lu' (Kitab al-Aghani, 1219 CE)

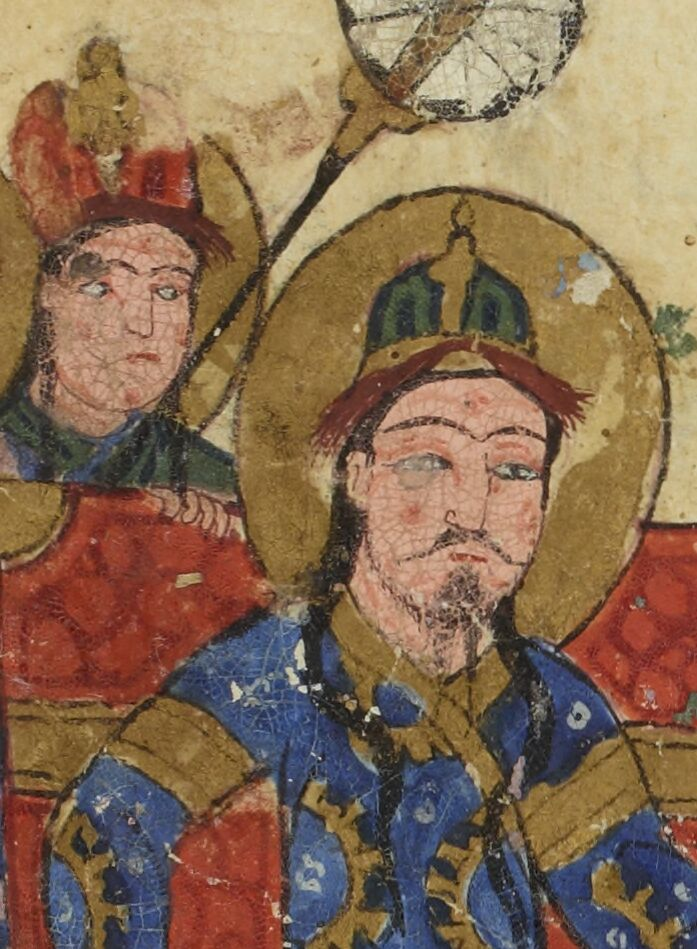
Maqamat al-Hariri (BNF Arabe 3929, circa 1200-1210), Turkic ruler detail wearing the sharbūsh with the tall cap

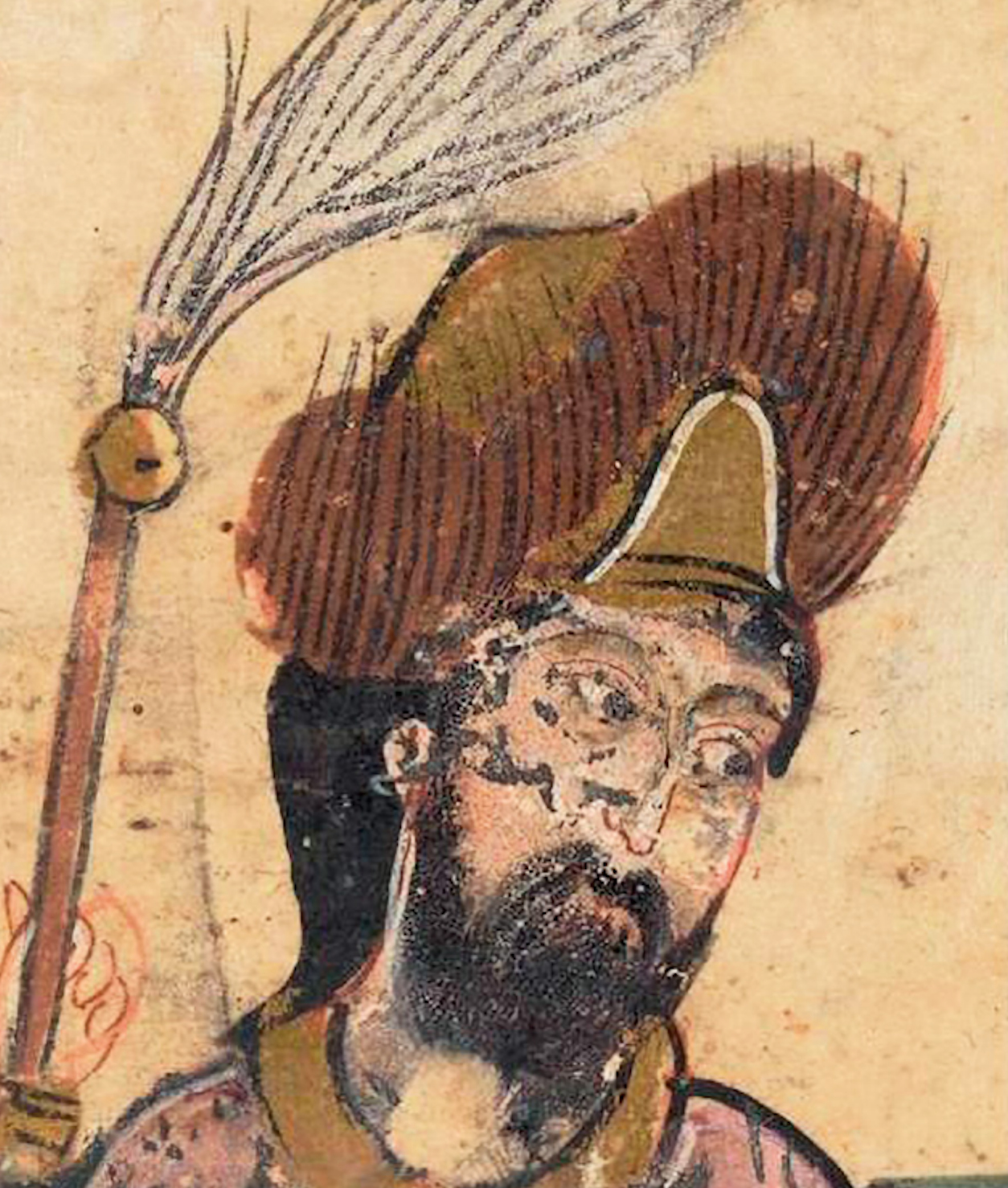
Maqamat al-Hariri (BNF Arabe 6094), Jazira region, 1222

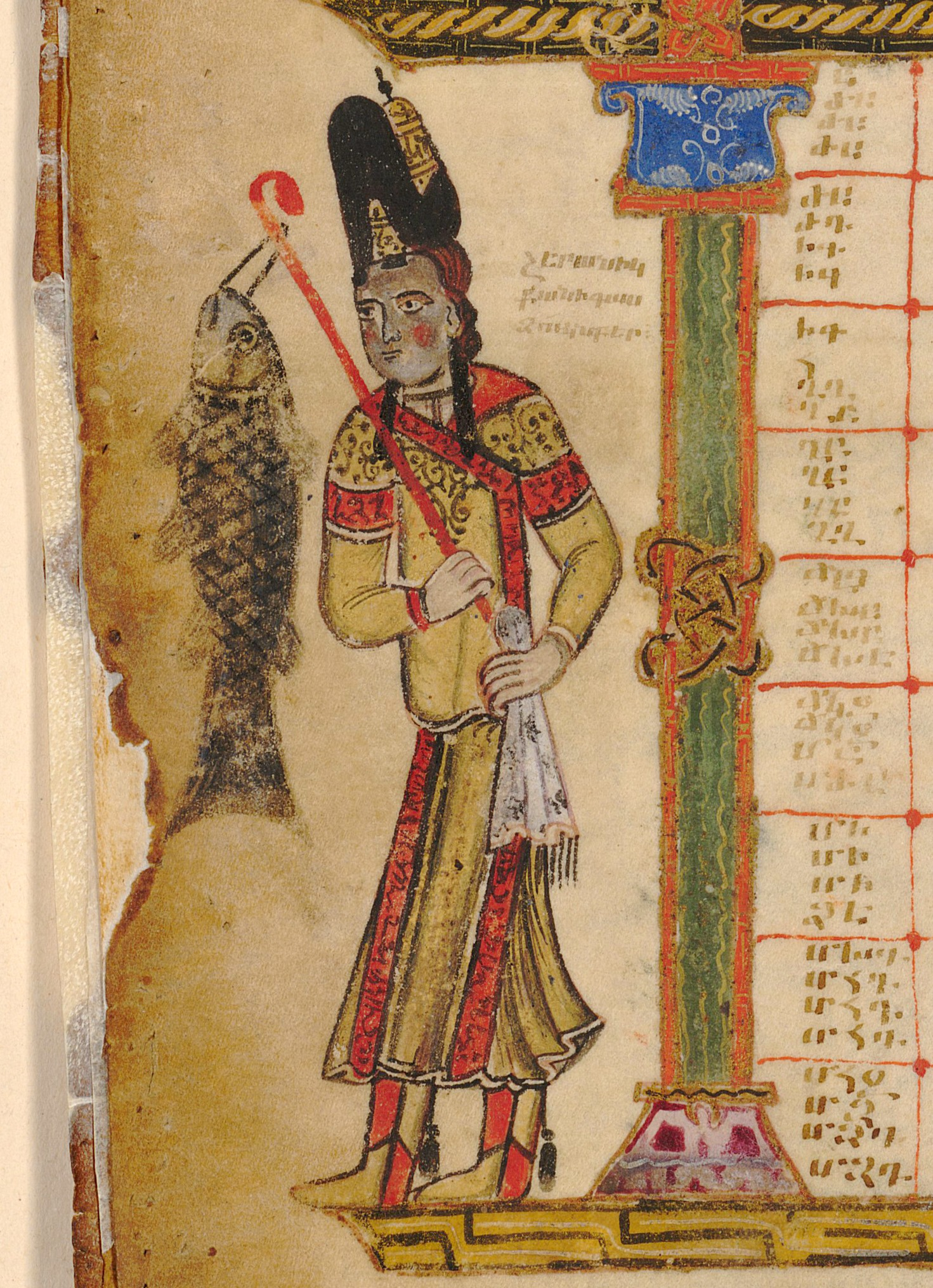
Sharbush in an Armenian manuscript, Haghbat Gospels, 1211.

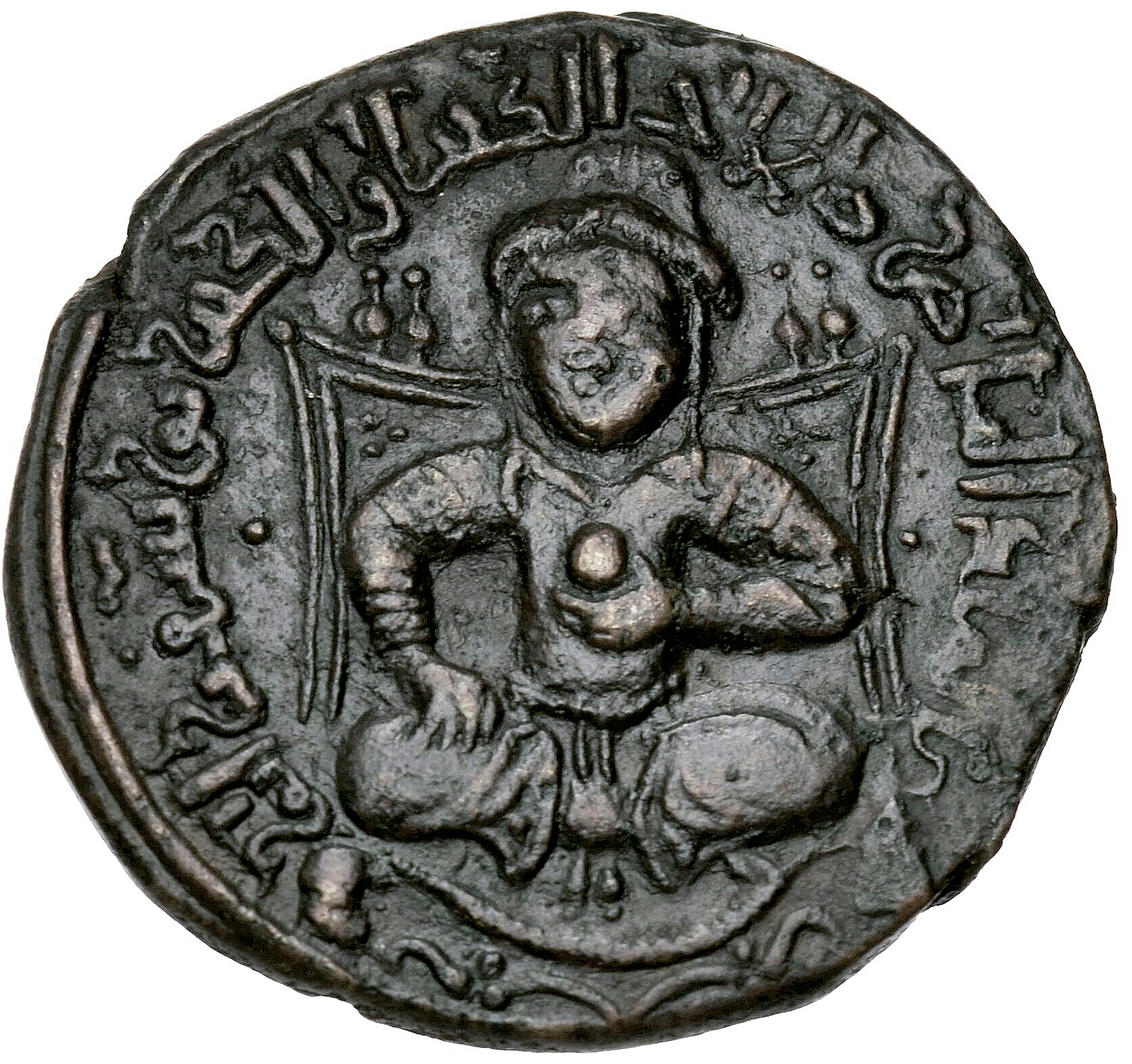
Dirham in the name of Saladin, wearing the Sharbush. Legend: "The Victorious King, Righteousness of the World and the Faith, Yusuf ibn Ayyub". Probable Mayyafariqin mint, dated 1190-1191.

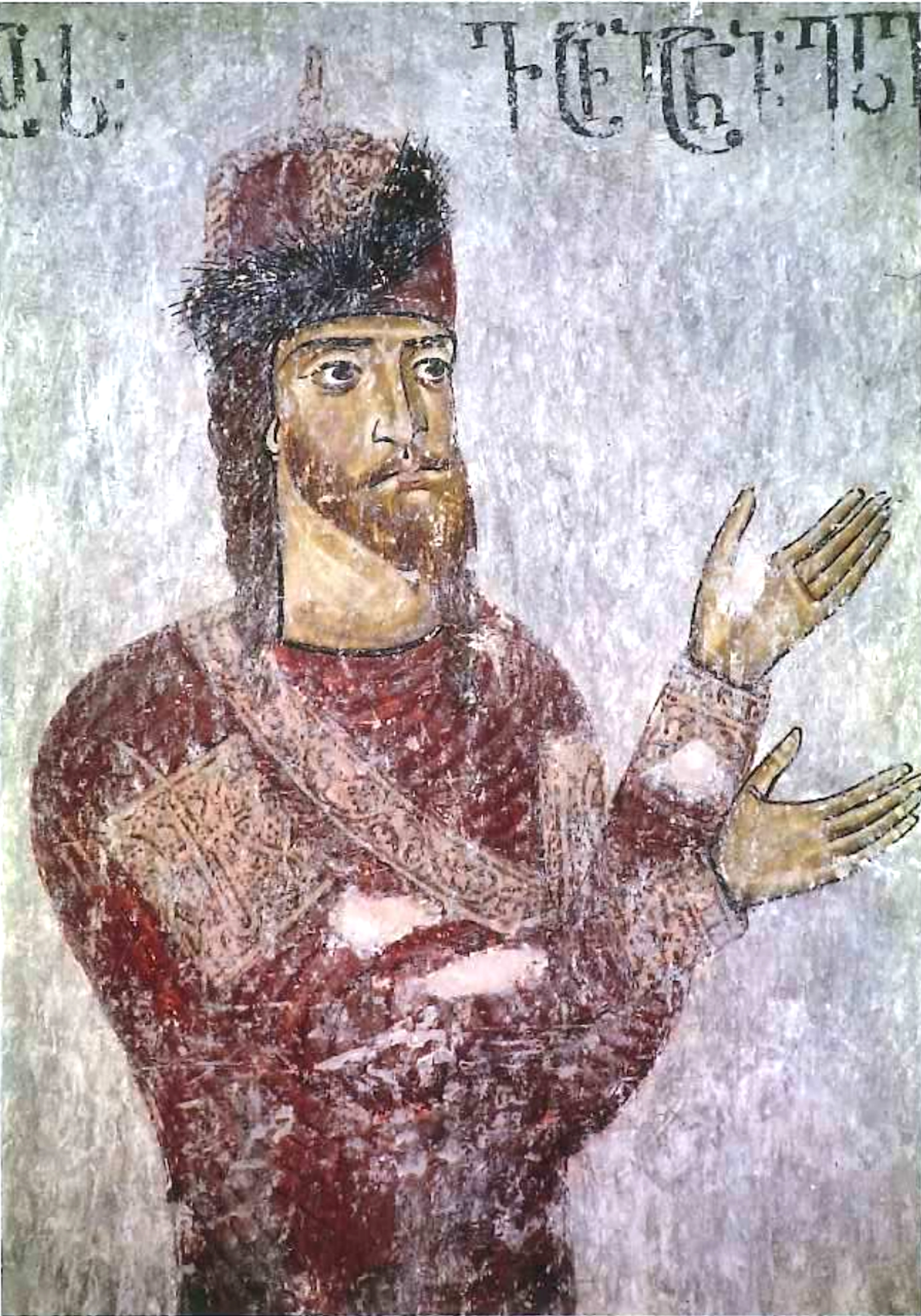
Donor figure wearing sharbush, qaba and tiraz. Church of the Archangels, Zemo-Krikhi, Racha, northern Georgia. 11th century, Inv. No. 03086-75.

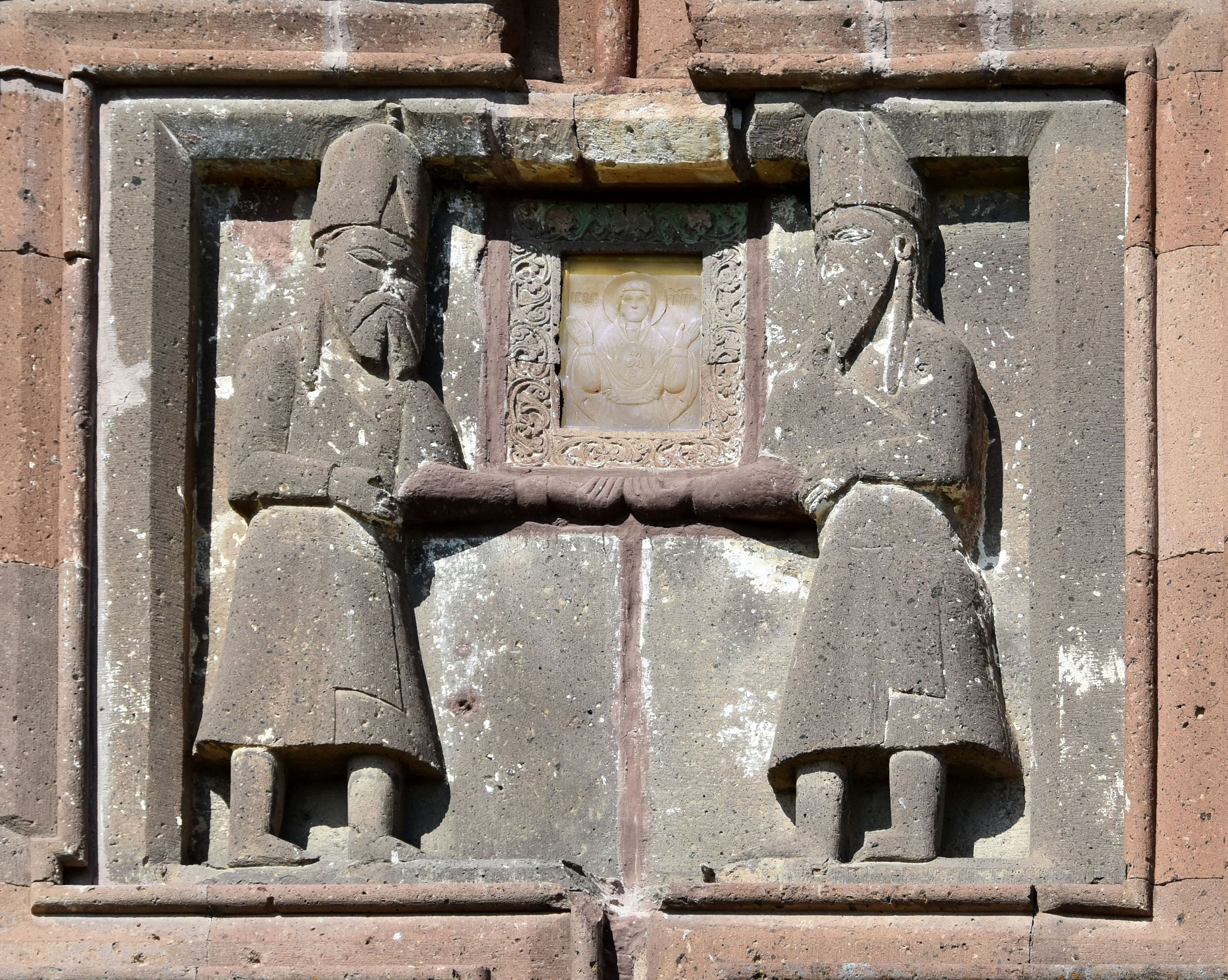
Armenian Princes Ivane and Zakare, 1201

== See also ==
- Saraquj
- List of hat styles
