= Sulaiman ibn Muhanna =

Lord of Palmyra

Lord of Palmyra
- Reign: November 1341–1343
- Predecessor: Musa ibn Muhanna
- Successor: Sharaf al-Din Issa

Amir al-ʿarab
- Reign: November 1341–1343
- Predecessor: Musa ibn Muhanna
- Successor: Sharaf al-Din Issa
- Died: 744 AH/1343 AD
Names
- Alam al-Din Sulaiman ibn Muhanna
- House: Al Fadl
- Father: Muhanna ibn Isa

Alam al-Din Sulaiman ibn Muhanna (Note: Full name and genealogy: Alam al-Dīn Sulaiman ibn Muhannā ibn ʿIsa ibn Muhannā ibn Maniʿ ibn Ḥadītha ibn Ghudayya ibn Faḍl ibn Rabīʿa ibn Ḥaẓim ibn ʿAlī ibn Mufarrij ibn Daghfal ibn al-Jarrāh at-Ṭaʾī) died November 1341) was the amir al-ʿarab (commander of the Bedouin tribes) in Syria and lord of Salamiyah and Palmyra under the Egyptian Mamluks in November 1341–1343. He was the chieftain of the Tayyid clan of Al Fadl, having succeeded his brother Musa ibn Muhanna. He went with Qaransunqur to the Ilkhanid Mongols and stayed there for seventeen years. Then he returned to Mamluk Egypt and resided in al-Rahba. His father and uncle Fadl provided him with money and warned him not to fall into the hands of the sultan.

== Biography ==
He was given the command of the Bedouin tribes, and he was described as brave and heroic. He went with Qaransunqur to the Mongols in Mardin, where he stayed for seventeen years. Then he returned to Mamluk Egypt and resided in al-Rahba. His father and uncle Fadl provided him with money and warned him not to fall into the hands of the sultan, he rode without their knowledge to Egypt, where al-Nasir Muhammad approached him and cut him off into feuds. He gave him a sum of money, then Al-Nasir Ahmad appointed him as commander of the Arabs in place of his brother Musa, and he continued to do so until he died in Rabi’ al-Awwal in the year 744 AH. Ibn Habib said he died in the year 745 AH.

He had deputies in the lands of the Euphrates who collected money for him, and he prevailed during his father’s life. He first came to al-Nasir in 711 AH, and he gave him one hundred thousand, then he came in 713 AH and returned to his father, the commander of the Arabs, and he took the leadership of Bedouins away from him and gave it to his brother Fadl. Then, in 715 AH, he became angry at the transfer of his fiefdom to his other relatives, so he joined Öljaitü who honored him, then Abu Sa'id honored him after him, then his brother Musa stayed with him until he left them and returned to Damascus, so he entered Cairo with a great gift, so al-Nasir honored him, and then when al-Nasir expelled his father, Muhanna, in 720 AH, Sulaiman joined Iraq as well, and spread his people and Arabs among the merchants and caravans, blocking the roads. Then he gave up that and returned to obedience and submitted obediently.

Qaransunqur, the deputy of the Levant, took refuge with him in 711 AH, fearing Sultan al-Nasir, so he traveled with him to the Mongol Ilkhan in Mardin. He stayed until 732 AH and returned and stayed at al-Rahba. His father and uncle Fadl warned him not to fall into the hands of the sultan, so he rode without their knowledge to Egypt. Al-Nasir accepted and appointed him as the commander of the Arabs instead of his brother Musa, or after the death of Musa (in 742 AH), so he continued in the position until he died in Salamiyah. He was brave and heroic, had it not been that some of his biography included injustices. “One of the most revered Arab kings,” said Ibn Taghribirdi.
