= Musa ibn Muhanna =

Lord of Palmyra
- Reign: 1335–November 1341
- Predecessor: Muhanna ibn Isa
- Successor: Sulaiman ibn Muhanna

Amir al-ʿarab
- Reign: 1335–November 1341
- Predecessor: Muhanna ibn Isa
- Successor: Sulayman ibn Muhanna
- Died: November 1341
- Issue: Umar
Names
- Muzaffar ad-Din Musa ibn Muhanna
- House: Al Fadl
- Father: Muhanna ibn Isa

Muzaffar ad-Din Musa ibn Muhanna (Note: Full name and genealogy: Muẓaffar ad-Dīn Mūsā ibn Muhannā ibn ʿIsa ibn Muhannā ibn Maniʿ ibn Ḥadītha ibn Ghudayya ibn Faḍl ibn Rabīʿa ibn Ḥaẓim ibn ʿAlī ibn Mufarrij ibn Daghfal ibn al-Jarrāh at-Ṭaʾī) (died November 1341) was the amir al-ʿarab (commander of the Bedouin tribes) in Syria and lord of Salamiyah and Palmyra under the Mamluks in 1335–November 1341. He was the chieftain of the Tayyid clan of Al Fadl, having succeeded his father Muhanna ibn Isa. Musa maintained close relations with Sultan an-Nasir Muhammad and cooperated with him during Muhanna's defection to the Mongol Ilkhanate and later during his own reign. In return for Musa's support and supply of noble Arabian horses, an-Nasir Muhammad granted substantial, high-income iqtaʿat (fiefs) in Syria.

== Biography ==
Musa was the son of Muhanna ibn Isa and grandson of Isa ibn Muhanna of the Al Fadl. The latter were a clan of the Banu Rabi'a, which was a branch of the Banu Jarrah, itself part of the large tribe of Tayy, which dominated the desert and steppe region between the Euphrates valley in the north to central Najd in the south. Muhanna served as amir al-ʿarab and lord of Salamiyah and Palmyra under the Mamluk Sultanate. During his reign, in 1311–1312, he defected to the Mongol Ilkhanate, but Musa remained loyal to the Mamluk sultan, an-Nasir Muhammad. Despite Musa's loyalty, the sultan appointed Muhanna's brother Fadl ibn Isa as amir al-ʿarab in his stead. Nonetheless, Musa was given an annual stipend and regularly visited the sultan in Cairo.

Musa succeeded his father as amir al-ʿarab in 1335. That year, Musa threatened an-Nasir Muhammad that he would lead a Bedouin rebellion against him if he did not restore iqtaʿat (fiefs; sing. iqtaʿ) to the Al Fadl that were previously confiscated by the family; the iqtaʿat had been redistributed to finance the Mamluk emirs and soldiers fighting on the frontier with Lesser Armenia. An-Nasir Muhammad ultimately obliged out of fear of a mass Bedouin defection to the Ilkhanate. To avoid a potential mutiny of the Mamluk troops fighting in Armenia, the Mamluk governor of Aleppo promised to intercede on their behalf and regain the iqtaʿat, but an-Nasir Muhammad remained committed to Musa. An-Nasir Muhammad was unprecedentedly enamored with the Bedouin and particularly sought the finest Arabian horses they bred. In 1337, he granted Musa an iqtaʿ whose income was one million silver dirhams in return for a single horse. A few months later, an-Nasir Muhammad paid 560,000 dirhams to Musa in exchange for several horses.

Musa collaborated with an-Nasir Muhammad to arrest the Mamluk viceroy of Syria, Tankiz al-Husami. Musa guaranteed his Bedouin forces would prevent Tankiz from fleeing should the sultan's troops fail to apprehend him. Musa departed Cairo after his meeting with the sultan and took command of his horsemen who were on standby near Homs. In the end, Musa's assistance did not prove necessary as Tankiz surrendered in early 1340 at the approach of the Mamluk army from Safad. Musa died in November 1341 and was succeeded by his brother Sulaiman ibn Muhanna. Later in the 14th century, Musa's son Umar and grandson Zamil held the post.

== Bibliography ==
- Abu al-Fida Isma'il ibn Ali (1983). Holt, Peter M. (ed.). The Memoirs of a Syrian Prince: Abu'l-Fidāʼ, Sultan of Ḥamāh (672-732/1273-1331). Steiner. ISBN 9783515036849.
- Hajji, Hayat Nasir (2000). The Internal Affairs in Egypt during the Third Reign of Sultan Al-Nāṣir Muḥammad B. Qalāwūn, 709-741/1309-1341. Kuwait University.
- Hiyari, Mustafa A. (1975). "The Origins and Development of the Amīrate of the Arabs during the Seventh/Thirteenth and Eighth/Fourteenth Centuries". Bulletin of the School of Oriental and African Studies. 38 (3): 509–524. doi:10.1017/s0041977x00048060. JSTOR 613705. S2CID 178868071.
- Levanoni, Amalia (1995). A Turning Point in Mamluk History: The Third Reign of Al-Nāṣir Muḥammad Ibn Qalāwūn (1310-1341). Brill. ISBN 9789004101821.
- Tritton, A. S. (1948). "The Tribes of Syria in the Fourteenth and Fifteenth Centuries". Bulletin of the School of Oriental and African Studies. 12 (3/4): 567–573. doi:10.1017/s0041977x00083129. JSTOR 608712. S2CID 161392172.
