= List of Palmyrene monarchs =

Below is a list of Palmyrene monarchs, the monarchs that ruled and presided over the city of Palmyra and the subsequent Palmyrene Empire in the 3rd century AD, and the later vassal princes of the Al Fadl dynasty which ruled over the city in the 14th century.

== House of Odaenathus ==
Odaenathus, the lord of Palmyra, declared himself king before riding into battle against the Sassanians after news of the Roman defeat at Edessa reached him. This elevated Palmyra from a subordinate city to a de facto independent kingdom allied to Rome.

Odaenathus later elevated himself to the title of King of Kings, crowning his son co-King of Kings in 263. The title was later passed to Vaballathus, his son, before it was dropped for the title of King and later Emperor.

Portrait	Name	Ruler From	Ruler Until	Relationship with Predecessor(s)	Title	Notes
	Odaenathus	260	267		King; King of Kings	Founder of the Palmyrene monarchy, dropped the King title and started using King of Kings by 263
	Hairan I	263	267	• Son of Odaenathus	King of Kings	Made co-King of Kings by his father.
	Maeonius	267	267	• Odaenathus' cousin.	Emperor	No evidence exists for his reign, but he allegedly murdered Odaenathus and his son, Hairan and attempted a usurpation
	Vaballathus	267	272	• Son of Odaenathus	King of Kings; King; Emperor	Dropped the "King of Kings" title in 270, replacing it with the Latin rex (king) and declared emperor in 271. Reigned under the regency of his mother, Zenobia.
	Zenobia	267	272	• Mother of Vaballathus	Queen; Empress	Ruled as a regent for her children and did not claim to rule in her own right.
	Antiochus	273	273	• Possibly a son of Zenobia.	Emperor	

== Al Fadl dynasty ==
Ruler	Reigned	Title	Notes
Sharaf ad-Din Issa	1281–1284	Prince	Appointed as a reward for aiding the Mamluks.
Husam ad-Din Muhanna	1284–1293	Prince	Imprisoned by the Mamluks.
Husam ad-Din Muhanna	1295–1312	Prince	Second reign.
Fadl ibn Isa	1312–1317	Prince	Brother of Muhanna.
Husam ad-Din Muhanna	1317–1320	Prince	Expelled with his tribe.
Husam ad-Din Muhanna	1330–1335	Prince	Fourth reign.
Muzaffar al-Din Musa	1335–1341	Prince	Son of Muhanna.
Alam al-Din Suleiman	1341–1342	Prince	Son of Muhanna.
Sharaf al-Din Issa	1342–1343	Prince	Son of Fadl bin Issa.
Saif	1343–1345	Prince	Son of Fadl bin Issa.
Ahmad	1345–1347	Prince	Son of Muhanna.
Saif	1347–1348	Prince	Second reign.
Ahmad	1348	Prince	Second reign.
Fayad	1348	Prince	Son of Muhanna.
Hayar	1348–1350	Prince	Son of Muhanna.
Fayad	1350–1361	Prince	Second reign.
Hayar	1361–1364	Prince	Second reign; rebelled and was dismissed.
Zamil	1364–1366	Prince	Son of Muhanna's brother Musa.
Hayar	1366–1368	Prince	Third reign; rebelled and was dismissed.
Zamil	1368	Prince	Second reign; rebelled and was dismissed.
Mu'ayqil	1368–1373	Prince	Son of Fadl bin Issa.
Hayar	1373–1375	Prince	Fourth reign.
Malik	1375–1379	Prince	Son of Muhanna.
Zamil	1379–1380	Prince	Third reign; ruled with Mu'ayqil.
Mu'ayqil	1379–1380	Prince	Second reign; ruled with Zamil.
Nu'air bin Hayar	1380–	Prince	Son of Hayar.
Musa	–1396	Prince	Son of Hayar's brother Assaf.
Suleiman II	1396–1398	Prince	Son of Hayar's brother 'Anqa.
Muhammad	1398–1399	Prince	Brother of Suleiman II.
Nu'air bin Hayar	1399–1406	Prince	Second reign.
