= Muzaffar al-Din =

Muzaffar al-Din can refer to:

- Gökböri, or Muzaffar ad-Din Gökböri (1154 – 1233), one of Saladins generals
- Muzaffar al-Din Uzbek, atabeg of the Eldiguzids from 1210 to 1225
- Musa ibn Muhanna, or Muzaffar al-Din Musa, (died 1341), Mamluk leader in Syria
- Mozaffar ad-Din Shah Qajar (1853 – 1907), Qajar king of Persia
