= Muhanna ibn Isa =

Lord of Palmyra

Muhanna ibn 'Isa

Lord of Palmyra
- Reign: 1284–1293; 1295–1312; 1317–1320; 1330–1335
- Predecessor: Isa ibn Muhanna
- Successor: Musa ibn Muhanna

Amir al-ʿarab
- Reign: 1284–1293; 1295–1312; 1317–1320; 1330–1335
- Predecessor: Isa ibn Muhanna
- Successor: Musa ibn Muhanna
- Died: 1335; Near Salamiyah
- Issue: Musa; Sulayman; Ahmad; Fayyad; Hayar; Qara
Names
- Husam ad-Din Muhanna ibn 'Isa
- House: Al Fadl
- Father: Isa ibn Muhanna

Husam ad-Din Muhanna ibn Isa (Note: Full name and genealogy: Ḥusām ad-Dīn Muhannā ibn ʿIsa ibn Muhannā ibn Maniʿ ibn Ḥadītha ibn Ghudayya ibn Faḍl ibn Rabīʿa ibn Ḥaẓim ibn ʿAlī ibn Mufarrij ibn Daghfal ibn al-Jarrāh at-Ṭaʾī) (also known as Muhanna II; d. 1335) was the Arab lord of Palmyra and amir al-ʿarab (commander of the Bedouins) under the Mamluk Sultanate. He served between 1284 and his death, but was dismissed and reinstated four times during this period. As the chieftain of the Al Fadl, a clan of the Tayy tribe, which dominated the Syrian Desert, Muhanna wielded considerable influence among the Bedouin. He was described by historian Amalia Levanoni as "the eldest and most senior amir" of the Al Fadl during his era.

Muhanna was first appointed amir al-ʿarab to replace his father Isa ibn Muhanna in 1284. He was imprisoned by Sultan al-Ashraf Khalil in 1293, but released two years later. In 1300, he commanded a wing of the Mamluk army in the Third Battle of Homs against the Mongol Ilkhanate. He defected to the latter in the early years of Sultan an-Nasir Muhammad's reign (1310–1341), ushering in a policy of playing off the Mamluks and the Mongols to further his own interests. An-Nasir eventually banished Muhanna and his tribe to the depths of the Syrian Desert. Through mediation by the Ayyubid prince, al-Afdal Muhammad, Muhanna reconciled with an-Nasir in 1330 and remained loyal to the Mamluks until his death five years later.

Muhanna was succeeded by his son Musa, and his descendants filled the office of amir al-ʿarab for the next seven decades with minor interruption. Throughout his reign, Muhanna was granted numerous iqtaʿat (fiefs) by an-Nasir, including Palmyra, Salamiyah, Sarmin and Douma. Muhanna later criticized an-Nasir's generous iqtaʿ distribution to the Bedouin tribes, believing it would ultimately degrade the character of the Bedouin and in turn, weaken the Muslim armies.

== Ancestry ==
Muhanna, also known as Muhanna II, belonged to the Al Fadl clan, a branch of the large Arab tribe of Tayy. His grandfather Muhanna ibn Mani' ibn Haditha ibn Ghudayya ibn Fadl ibn Rabi'a al-Ta'i or "Muhanna I" was the head of the clan and sometimes referred to as the "king of the Arabs" by the Mamluk government; his son Isa became the first lord of Palmyra as a reward for supporting the Mamluk sultan Qalawun in the Second Battle of Homs in 1281.

== Lord of Palmyra ==
=== First and second reigns ===
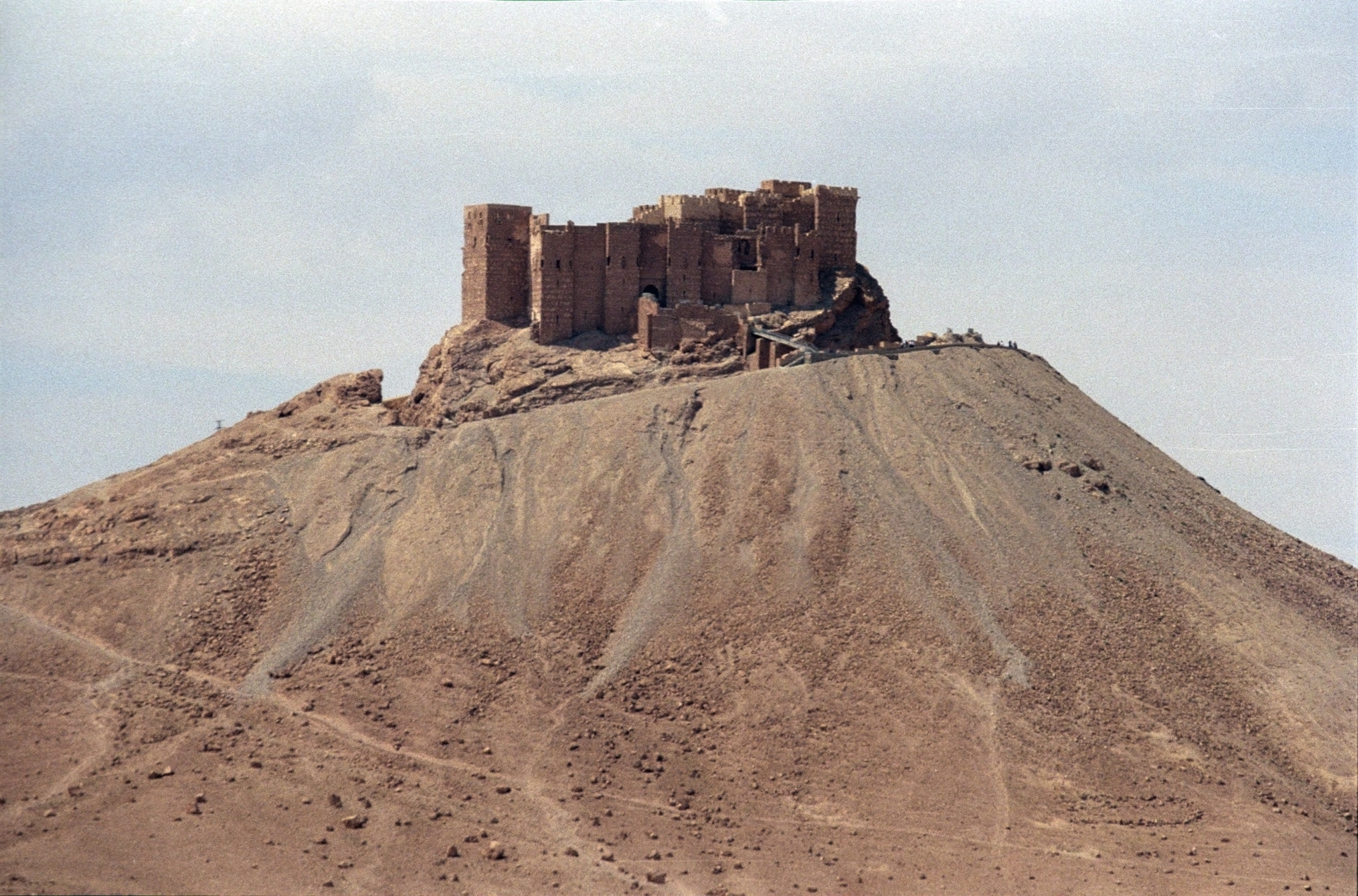
The castle of Palmyra; the city's center of power

Muhanna succeeded his father 'Isa as lord of Palmyra and amir al-ʿarab in 1284, after receiving the appointment from Sultan Qalawun. Muhanna visited Qalawun's successor, Sultan al-Ashraf Khalil, in Cairo in 1291. In 1293, after celebrating the wedding of his granddaughter, Muhanna and his sons and brothers met al-Ashraf Khalil at the wells of Furqlus, near Homs, where the sultan had been on a hunting expedition. Al-Ashraf Khalil had Muhanna and his family arrested and imprisoned in the Cairo Citadel. Muhanna was replaced by his distant cousin, Muhammad ibn Abu Bakr, from the Al Ali branch of Al Fadl. Muhanna was released with his family and restored as amir al-ʿarab and lord of Palmyra two years later by Sultan al-Adil Kitbugha. In 1298, Muhanna performed the Hajj pilgrimage to Mecca.

Muhanna later commanded the right wing of the Mamluk army during the Third Battle of Homs in 1299/1300, during which the Mamluks were defeated by the Mongol Ilkhanids. In 1311, the Mamluk na'ib (governor) of Aleppo, Qarasunqur, defected to the Ilkhanids and was given refuge by Muhanna, who unsuccessfully attempted to mediate between Qarasunqur and Sultan an-Nasir Muhammad (r. 1310–1341). These circumstances together with Muhanna's suspicions of an-Nasir's negative disposition toward him prompted Muhanna and Qarasunqur to seek safe haven in Ilkhanid-held Iraq. To that end, in 1312, Muhanna sent his son Musa to confer with Öljaitü of the Ilkhanate, and afterward he defected to the latter with his son Sulayman; unlike his father, Musa remained loyal to the Mamluks. Öljaitü gave Muhanna iqtaʿat (fiefs) in al-Hillah, south of Baghdad. An-Nasir Muhammad consequently dismissed Muhanna from his principality and appointed his brother Fadl ibn Isa the lord of Palmyra.

=== Third reign ===
Muhanna arrived at the Ilkhan's court in 1316, but then decided to go back to Palmyra where he was contacted by the sultan who summoned him to his court in Cairo. Muhanna avoided meeting the sultan, and sent his brothers and sons instead. He was able to gain the sultan's forgiveness and was restored to his position in 1317. The defection and subsequent reconciliation with an-Nasir marked the first episode in Muhanna's policy of extracting maximum gain from both the Mamluks and the Ilkhanids. According to contemporary historian Abu'l Fida, who maintained good ties with the Al Fadl, Muhanna pursued a policy whereby both the Mamluks and Ilkhanids accorded him iqtaʿat, money and robes of honor while he stayed effectively neutral, "not going to this party or that; a case the like of which had never happened before". Moreover, Fadl too participated in this policy with Muhanna, albeit discreetly; the contemporary historian al-Umari wrote "Muhanna and Fadl were agreed at heart, but openly they were otherwise".

An-Nasir sought to keep the Al Fadl loyal to him and prevent their defection to the Ilkhanate, as well as ensure they would not disrupt peaceful travel on the roads. To accomplish this, an-Nasir adopted an unprecedented policy among Mamluk sultans by distributing large iqtaʿat and grants to the Bedouin, namely the Al Fadl. Moreover, an-Nasir granted Al Fadl members' requests for possession of particularly lucrative iqtaʿat belonging to the Mamluk emirs (commanders/princes) of Aleppo, Hama and Damascus (the Mamluk emirs were typically compensated with other iqtaʿat). In addition to Palmyra, Sarmin and Salamiyah, Muhanna was also given the town of Douma in the Ghouta near Damascus as an iqta. Muhanna criticized an-Nasir for the lavish distribution of iqtaʿat to his tribesmen out of belief that such excesses would ruin the character of the Bedouin and ultimately weaken the Muslim armies. He also asserted to an-Nasir that "even if he [sic] wished to change this situation ... you will no longer be able to do so" since the tribesmen would not willingly forfeit their new properties.

Muhanna later reestablished contact with the Ilkhanate, causing the sultan to banish him with his whole tribe in 1320. On an-Nasir's order, the Mamluk army in Syria drove the Al Fadl from their home district of Salamiyah and pursued them eastward up to the Euphrates fortress towns of al-Rahba and Anah. According to Ibn Abi al-Fada'il, Muhanna was punished because he went back on an agreement his son Sulayman made with an-Nasir in 1319. The agreement stipulated that the Al Fadl would receive 250,000 silver dirhams and the iqtaʿat of Adhri'at and Bosra in return for joining the Mamluk army as auxiliaries in an upcoming campaign against Ilkhanid-held Sinjar; an-Nasir gave them the iqtaʿat and money, but when the Mamluk army arrived, Muhanna's forces stopped it at 'Urd near Palmyra and refused it passage through Al Fadl territory. The tribe was exiled from their encampments in the Palmyrene steppe and were forced to live deep in the Syrian Desert.

=== Final reign and death ===
Ten years later, Muhanna contacted the Ayyubid emir al-Afdal Muhammad of Hama (vassal of the Mamluks), and requested that he intercede with the sultan on Muhanna's behalf; an-Nasir ultimately forgave Muhanna, reinstating him in 1330. This marked the end of Muhanna's policy of playing the Mamluks and Ilkhanids against each other. Thereafter, Muhanna remained loyal to the sultanate until his death near Salamiyah in June 1335, at around age 80. According to historian A. S. Tritton, "there was public lamentation" for Muhanna's death and "black was worn" in mourning.

== Legacy ==
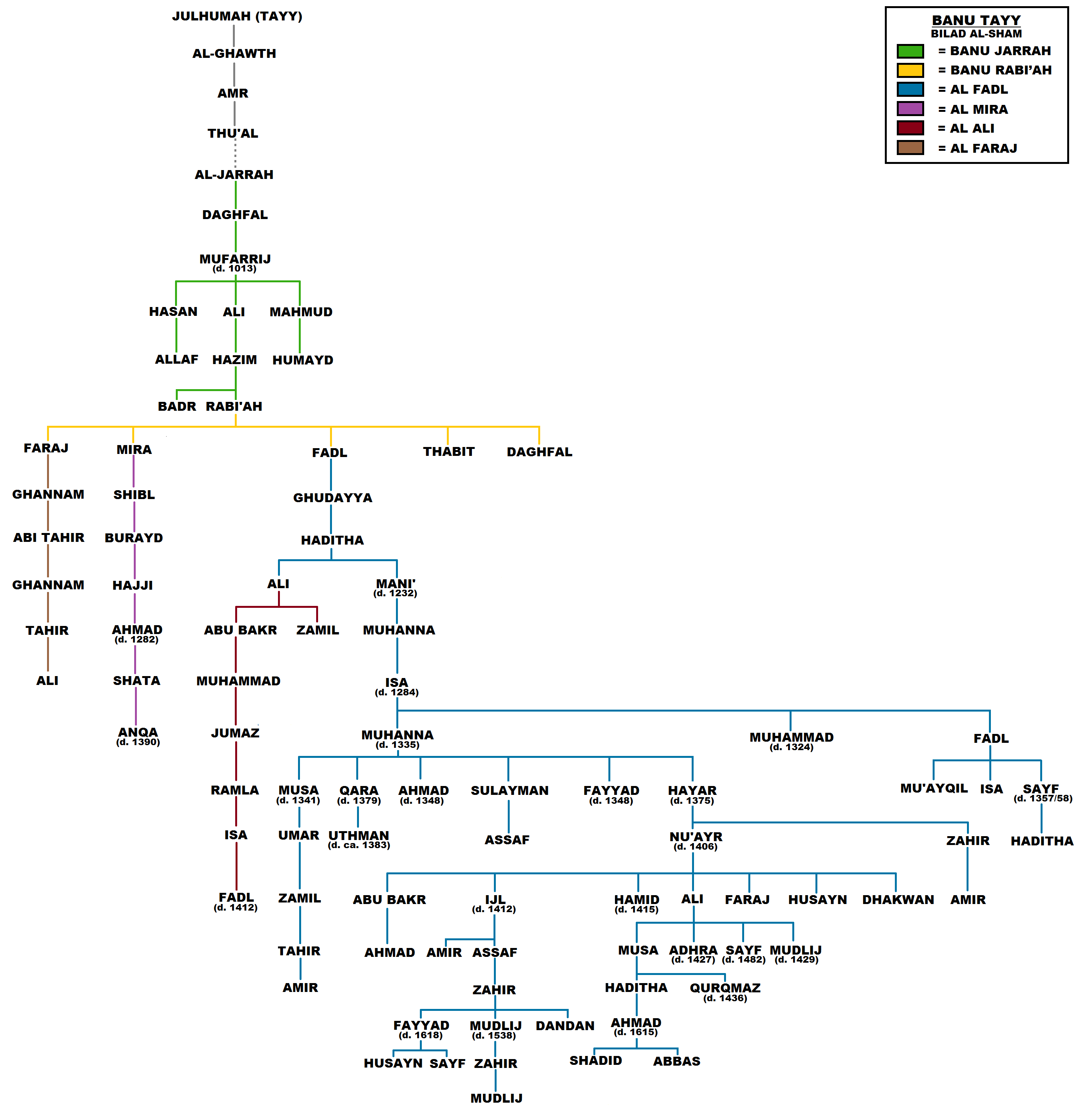
Genealogy of the Banu Tayy tribe of Syria. The Al Fadl branch is depicted by the blue line

Historian Amalia Levanoni described Muhanna as "the eldest and most senior amir" of the Al Fadl during his era. By 1352, Muhanna's descendants amounted to 110 men, all with their own clans, iqtaʿ and princely titles. According to Levanoni, Muhanna's warning to an-Nasir about the effects of distributing and subsequently seizing iqtaʿat "came true only a short time" after Muhanna's death, when his son and successor, Musa, threatened to start a Bedouin revolt and defect to the Ilkhanate if an-Nasir did not return iqtaʿat confiscated from the Al Fadl.

== See also ==
- Al-Fadl dynasty

== Bibliography ==
- Abu al-Fida Isma'il ibn Ali (1983). Holt, Peter M. (ed.). The Memoirs of a Syrian Prince: Abu'l-Fidāʼ, Sultan of Ḥamāh (672-732/1273-1331). Steiner. ISBN 9783515036849.
- Allsen, Thomas T. (2011). The Royal Hunt in Eurasian History. University of Pennsylvania Press. ISBN 9780812201079.
- Hiyari, Mustafa A. (1975). "The Origins and Development of the Amīrate of the Arabs during the Seventh/Thirteenth and Eighth/Fourteenth Centuries". Bulletin of the School of Oriental and African Studies. 38 (3): 509–524. doi:10.1017/s0041977x00048060. JSTOR 613705. S2CID 178868071.
- Levanoni, Amalia (1995). A Turning Point in Mamluk History: The Third Reign of Al-Nāṣir Muḥammad Ibn Qalāwūn (1310–1341). Brill. ISBN 9789004101821.
- Tritton, A. S. (1948). "The Tribes of Syria in the Fourteenth and Fifteenth Centuries". Bulletin of the School of Oriental and African Studies. 12 (3/4): 567–573. doi:10.1017/s0041977x00083129. JSTOR 608712. S2CID 161392172.
