= Amir al-ʿarab =

Leader of the Bedouin tribes in Syria

The amir al-ʿarab (Arabic: أمير العرب, also known as amir al-ʿurban, أمير العربان; lit. 'commander of the Bedouins') was the commander or leader of the Bedouin tribes in Syria under successive medieval Muslim states. The title was used as early as the 11th century to refer to Salih ibn Mirdas, but was formalized as a state institution by the Ayyubid Sultanate and strengthened by the latter's Mamluk successors. The office was preserved under the early Ottomans (16th–17th centuries), at least ceremonially, but its importance had declined by then. The jurisdiction of the amir al-ʿarab was generally limited to central and northern Syria, and its holder often held iqtaʿat (fiefs) in the Syrian steppe, which formed the imarat al-ʿarab (emirate of the Bedouins). The imarat al-ʿarab was created both to co-opt the often rebellious Bedouin tribes of Syria and to enlist their support as auxiliary troops. Under the Mamluks, some of the principal duties of the amir al-ʿarab were guarding the desert frontier against the Mongol Ilkhanate in Iraq and Anatolia, ensuring Bedouin loyalty to the state, gathering intelligence on enemy forces, protecting infrastructure, villages and travelers from raids and providing horses and camels to the sultan. In return, the amir al-ʿarab was given iqtaʿat, an annual salary, official titles and honorary robes.

Under the Ayyubids, numerous Arab emirs held the post at any given time and were granted iqtaʿat. However, with the onset of Mamluk rule in Syria in 1260, it became a hereditary office consolidated by members of the Al Fadl dynasty, direct descendants of the Tayyid clan of Banu Jarrah. The office remained in the household of the Al Fadl emir, Isa ibn Muhanna, with occasional interruption, well into the early Ottoman era, during which Isa's descendants took over leadership of the Mawali tribe. Under the Ottomans, the role of the amir al-ʿarab centered on the provision of camels to the state and protection of the Hajj pilgrim caravan in return for annual payments.

== Administration ==
The Ayyubids founded the imarat al-ʿarab (emirate of the Bedouins) as a formal state institution. However, due to the fractious nature of the Ayyubid political system, the appointed amir al-ʿarab (pl. umara al-ʿarab) was often unable to maintain authority over all of the Bedouin chieftains, who generally viewed the amir al-ʿarab as their equal rather than their superior. Under the Mamluks, the amir al-ʿarab was appointed by the sultan in Egypt and was considered a state official. His iqtaʿ (fief; pl. iqtaʿat) grants were given to him in a diploma delivered by the sultan's chancery or picked up by the amir al-ʿarab himself if he was visiting the sultan's court in Cairo. In the Mamluk provinces of Damascus, Aleppo and the capital, Cairo, a department called the mihmandāriyya dealt with managing Bedouin affairs and receiving the amir al-ʿarab. The amir al-ʿarab and the other Bedouin emirs were classified as arbāb al-suyūf (men of the sword), i.e. part of the military hierarchy. The rank of an amir al-ʿarab was equal to an amir miʿa muqaddam alf (emir of one hundred [mounted troops], commander of one thousand) and nāẓir al-jaysh (head of the army) of the province of Damascus and the na'ib (governor) of Homs.

The early Ottomans preserved the imarat al-arab at least during the 16th century, during which the title was referred to as amir ʿarab-i Shām. However, the rights and role of the amir al-arab and his status in the Ottoman administration in Ottoman Syria are not well-defined in the contemporary sources, according to historian Muhammad Adnan Bakhit. The provincial records of Damascus Eyalet (Province of Damascus), whose jurisdiction extended throughout Syria until the mid-16th century, do not mention the emirate's function. Moreover, Bakhit asserts that it is unclear if the sultan's ratification was required for the Bedouin tribes or the provincial government to recognize the amir al-arab.

=== Incorporation into iqtaʿ system ===
Most chieftains under the Ayyubids were incorporated into the iqtaʿ system and received customary payments from the Ayyubids. The Ayyubids' Mamluk successors paid closer attention to the Bedouin tribes of Syria as they considered the region to be an important frontier in the wars with the Crusaders in the coastal areas and the Mongol Ilkhanate in Anatolia and Iraq. The Mamluks relied on the Bedouin as auxiliary troops and were wary of their unstable, but much-needed, loyalty to the state, and referred to the iqtaʿat of the amir al-ʿarab as an "iqtaʿ iʿtidād (fief of reliance). This status officially precluded the Bedouin from the military service required of iqtaʿ-holders, indicating "a special relationship" between the state and the Bedouin, according to historian Tsugato Sato. In practice, however, the Bedouin of Syria were often called on to participate as auxiliary troops in military expeditions or in emergency situations.

The Bedouin iqtaʿat were small compared to those of the mamluk (manumitted slave soldier) emirs, though a number of sultans granted particularly generous iqtaʿat to the amir al-ʿarab. The distribution of iqtaʿat to the tribes was done, at least in part, to persuade them not plunder the unfortified towns and villages of the countryside as they were normally wont to do, and to induce them to cooperate with the state. The frequent rebellion of the tribes also motivated the Mamluks to incorporate them into the iqtaʿ system. The iqtaʿ of the amir al-ʿarab would often be confiscated in cases of rebellion against the sultan. In general, Salamiyah and Palmyra consistently served as iqtaʿat of the amir al-ʿarab, continuing into the early Ottoman era, when the iqtaʿ was supplanted by the timar. Besides Salamiyah and Palmyra, the Ottomans granted the amir al-ʿarab timar grants in the Hawran plain south of Damascus.

=== Duties ===
In return for iqtaʿat, annual customary payments, and honorary titles and robes, the amir al-ʿarab was expected to command his horsemen as auxiliaries in the wars against the Mongols, the Crusaders, their allies and rebellious Mamluk emirs. Another expectation of the amir al-ʿarab and the lower-ranking tribal chieftains was intelligence gathering regarding enemy movements near the frontier. Among the official duties of the amir al-ʿarab and the Syrian Bedouin tribes was the defense of the sultanate's boundaries, and maintenance and oversight of the roads, bridges and mountain passes of the desert and within their iqtaʿat. This also entailed the protection of merchant travelers and the annual Hajj pilgrim caravan, which traversed Bedouin territory to reach the Muslim holy cities of Mecca and Medina in the Hejaz. Tribesmen also served as desert guides for the army and state officials. The amir al-ʿarab was further responsible for collecting zakat (dues) on the livestock of the Bedouin tribes.

During Sultan Baybar's reign (1260–1277), a barid (postal route) was created between Egypt and Syria, which enabled the sultan to remain constantly notified of developments in the provinces. It served as a major centralizing factor in the Mamluk state, and each postal station required transport horses, which the tribes provided. According to Sato, the tribes' supply of horses and camels was "indispensable for the maintenance" of the barid. Noble horses and young camels were also provided by the amir al-ʿarab to the royal stables of the Mamluk sultans on an annual basis. Under the early Ottomans, the amir al-ʿarab was required to provision the sultan's stables with 1,050 young camels and 30 young horses, the collective annual value of which was 240,000 akçe. This formed part of the sultan's revenue from the Damascus Eyalet.

== History ==
=== Origins ===
The Syrian Desert, which extended from Balis to Ayla, had been inhabited by Bedouin (nomadic Arab) tribes since pre-Islamic times (before mid-7th century). Throughout the 250 years following the Muslim conquest of Syria in the 630s, the Bedouin were brought under the authority of the Rashidun (632–661), Umayyad (661–750) and early Abbasid (750–861) caliphates. However, during this period, certain Bedouin tribes also participated in Umayyad dynastic struggles, the Abbasid Revolution, the rebellious Kharijite and Alid movements and isolated revolts. Following the Abbasid decline beginning in 861, state authority in the Syrian Desert receded significantly, leaving the Bedouin tribes to fill the void. The Hamdanid dynasty (890–1004), members of the Banu Taghlib tribe, represented the new-found strength of the Bedouin, and according to 14th-century historian Ibn Khaldun, they commanded the subservience of all Bedouin tribes in the Syrian steppe and Upper Mesopotamia. Other tribal dynasties that emerged in this region before or after the heyday of the Hamdanids included the Uqaylids (990–1096), Numayrids (990–1081), the Banu Asad and Banu Khafaja. By the late 10th century, the Jarrahids (970s–mid 11th century) of Banu Tayy and the Mirdasids (1024–1080) of Banu Kilab dominated southern and northern Syria, respectively, first in association with the Qarmatians, and then as nominal partners of the Fatimids, who ruled Syria between 977 and 1071. As a result of the Turkic Seljuk invasion in the latter half of the 11th century, only the Banu Rabi'ah, a cadet branch of the Jarrahids, remained as an influential Arab force in the Syrian steppe by the end of the century.

There is scant information about the management of the Syrian Bedouin by the ruling Muslim states between the early 11th and mid-13th centuries. Likewise, the origins of the title of amir al-ʿarab are unclear. A number of medieval Muslim chroniclers referred to Salih ibn Mirdas (d. 1029), the founder of the Mirdasid emirate in Aleppo, as amir ʿarab al-Sham, which translates from Arabic as "commander of the Bedouin of Syria". Salih's ally Hassan ibn Mufarrij, chieftain of the Jarrahids, was also referred to as amir al-ʿarab by medieval sources. According to historian Suhayl Zakkar, the "value" of the title "is not known but at least indicates the high position of its holder". Moreover, Zakkar asserts:

It is not known whether Salih [ibn Mirdas] was the first holder of this title or whether, indeed, it had existed previously. The origin of it is obscure for whether it was created by the tribes of Syria after Islam or whether it existed in Arabia before the rise of Islam and was then carried to Syria after the Islamic conquest in the 7th century is not known.

Zakkar speculates that the amir al-ʿarab title could have been a "revival or continuation" of a pre-Islamic (mid-6th century) political tradition among the Bedouin of Syria whereby the supreme phylarch (chieftain) of the Ghassanids, Arab vassals of the Byzantine Empire, had formal authority over the other Bedouin tribes of Syria. Furthermore, early Muslim chronicles often made references to sayyid ahl al-badiya (master of the desert dwellers) or sayyid Qays (master of the tribes of Qays), which Zakkar believes are possible "starting points which, in the course of time, developed to the title of Amir Arab al-Sham".

=== Ayyubid era ===
During the Zengid period in Syria (1128–1182), some Bedouin chieftains were accorded iqtaʿat, paid ʿidād (livestock tax), and performed military duties. However, the groundwork for regulating Bedouin affairs in Syria was first laid by Saladin (r. 1171–1193), founder of the Ayyubid Sultanate; in 1182, Saladin entrusted the governor of Damascus, Ibn al-Muqaddam, as the muḥakkim (arbitrator) and overseer of "all the Arabs" who was "responsible for ... making the customary payments to them and collecting the customary dues from them". According to historian Mustafa A. Hiyari, Saladin's brother and successor, Sultan al-Adil (r. 1200–1218), founded the formal institution of the imarat al-ʿarab (emirate of the Bedouin) and appointed Haditha ibn Ghudayya as the first amir al-ʿarab. Haditha was a grandson of the Jarrahid emir Fadl ibn Rabi'ah, the progenitor of the Al Fadl clan of Banu Rabi'ah. Members of the clan were direct descendants of the Fatimid-era Jarrahid governor of Palestine, Mufarrij ibn Daghfal ibn al-Jarrah (d. 1013). By the late 12th century, the Banu Rabi'ah and its sub-clans, Al Fadl, Al Mira and Al Faraj, together with other sub-clans of its ancestral tribe, the Tayy, dominated the desert and steppe regions between Homs in the west to the eastern banks of the Euphrates River and southward to central Najd and Hejaz. However, despite their influence, the Mamluk historian al-Hamdani (d. 1300) maintains that "no member of this clan [Banu Rabi'ah] was appointed as amir al-ʿarab by diploma from the sultan" until Haditha's appointment by al-Adil.

Meanwhile, leaders of the Kilab continued to hold the title of amir al-ʿarab after the Ayyubid conquest of Aleppo in 1182. As a result, Haditha's jurisdiction initially did not extend to the Aleppo region (northern Syria). However, during the latter half of az-Zahir Ghazi (r. 1193–1216) of Aleppo's reign, the Kilab were brought under Haditha's authority and were stripped of the amir al-ʿarab title. According to medieval Arab historian Ibn al-Adim (d. 1262), the Kilab's status was downgraded because of the growing power of the Tayy clans, while al-Hamdani asserts that the numerically-superior Kilab were weakened by a divided leadership. Following the extension of Haditha's jurisdiction to their traditional territory, some of the Kilab migrated north to Anatolia, while those who remained became allies of Haditha's Al Fadl clan.

Following al-Adil's death in 1218 and the death of Haditha a few years later, the imarat al-ʿarab was divided by Sultan al-Kamil (r. 1218–1238) between Haditha's sons Mani and Ali, who founded the independent Al Ali branch of Al Fadl, and their kinsman, Ghannam ibn Abi Tahir of the Al Faraj clan. As Mani's position was bolstered by his cooperation with the Ayyubids in their military campaigns and keeping the Bedouin in check, al-Kamil dismissed Ghannam and Ali, leaving Mani as the sole amir al-ʿarab. When Mani died in 1232/33, he was succeeded by his son Muhanna I after an agreement between the Ayyubid emirs of Homs and Damascus, al-Mujahid Shirkuh II and al-Ashraf Musa, respectively, without input from the sultan of Egypt. From this period until 1260, only scant information is available about the imarat al-ʿarab. However, it is known that in 1240, Muhanna I was replaced by Tahir ibn Ghannam by the Ayyubid regent of Aleppo, Dayfa Khatun, for Tahir's support against her dynastic opponents. Some years later, the title was bestowed on Ali or his son Abu Bakr.

=== Mamluk era ===
The Mamluk Sultanate annexed Syria in 1260, and maintained the imarat al-ʿarab. In 1260–1261, sultans Qutuz or Baybars replaced Ali or Abu Bakr with Isa ibn Muhanna, who was granted Sarmin and half of Salamiyah as his iqtaʿ. Ahmad ibn Tahir and Zamil ibn Ali contested Isa's appointment, with the former demanding part of the emirate and the latter seeking to replace Isa. Baybars did not accord Ahmad ibn Tahir a share but gave him iqta'at elsewhere in Syria, whereas Zamil opened a rebellion against Isa. The latter called for Mamluk support and Zamil was consequently apprehended by Mamluk troops from Aleppo. He was imprisoned in Cairo but soon after released after Baybars mediated between him, Isa and other Banu Rabi'ah emirs. A further challenge to Isa came from his powerful kinsman, Ahmad ibn Hajji of Al Mira, who eventually desisted from confronting Isa when Baybars gave him virtual independence in the southern Syrian Desert. Ahmad ibn Hajji was referred to malik al-ʿarab (king of the Bedouin) in Mamluk sources and numerous tribes came under his authority.

Relations between Isa and the state were generally cooperative with few exceptions, and he participated in nearly all Mamluk military campaigns against the Mongol Ilkhanate. Toward the end of his reign, in 1281, Isa received the oasis town of Palmyra as additional iqtaʿ from Sultan Qalawun. His son Muhanna ibn Isa succeeded him following his death in 1284. Muhanna and his brother Fadl ibn Isa, who served as amir al-ʿarab in between Muhanna's dismissals, vacillated between the Mamluks under Sultan an-Nasir Muhammad and the Ilkhanate between 1311 and 1330. Afterward, the Al Fadl became firmly part of the Mamluk camp. An-Nasir Muhammad particularly lavished the Al Fadl emirs with iqta'at, gifts and honors to the extent that Muhanna criticized the policy as over-indulging the Bedouin, and in the process, weakening the Muslim army. The imarat al-ʿarab remained in the hands of Isa's household, particularly the direct descendants of Muhanna (Al Muhanna), through the remainder of Mamluk rule (1260–1516) with brief interruptions during which emirs from Al Ali held the post. By 1352, Al Muhanna numbered 110, all of whom held their own emirate and iqta'at. According to Mustafa A. Hiyari:

The manipulation of the emirate [sic] by Al Muhanna for such a long time was the result of their ability to serve the interests of the Mamluk state more than any other clan. Their prestige was such that they were able to maintain peace and order among the tribes and—what was much more important—to secure the safety of the hajj and trade routes. That is why the sultans of Egypt and their provincial governors (sing. na'ib) in Damascus and Aleppo tried always to keep them under control and use every possible way to bring them back under the authority of the sultanate when they revolted, because their remaining outside Mamluk authority would lead to continuous threats to the state's interests, the outcome of which would be the attacking and looting of the trade caravans, the disruption of the hajj, and considerable damage to the countryside.

Muhanna was succeeded by his son Muzaffar ad-Din Musa, who had remained loyal to an-Nasir Muhammad during his father's defection to the Ilkhanate. An-Nasir Muhammad granted him substantial iqtaʿat in return for his loyalty and the supply of noble Arabian horses, which an-Nasir Muhammad was particularly fond of. An-Nasir Muhammad's lavish treatment of Musa and his family significantly empowered the Al Fadl and created "ties of obligation" that "could not be ignored by his [an-Nasir Muhammad's] successors without provoking a Bedouin mutiny", according to historian Amalia Levanoni. This was especially so as central government control over Syria increasingly diminished during the power vacuum following an-Nasir Muhammad's death. Rivalry over the imarat al-ʿarab between the descendants of Muhanna and Fadl also intensified during this period. When Isa ibn Fadl was made amir al-ʿarab in 1342 and was transferred the Al Muhanna's iqtaʿat, the Al Muhanna responded by assaulting Fadl's offspring and plundering caravans traveling the roads of northern Syria. This included a raid on a Rahba-bound caravan from Baghdad in which Al Muhanna tribesmen looted all of its merchandise. Isa was replaced by his brother Sayf in 1343, after which Muhanna's son Fayyad defeated Sayf in battle and seized 20,000 of his camels. Ahmad ibn Muhanna, who had been imprisoned in 1342, was reappointed amir al-ʿarab in 1345, and was succeeded two years later by Fayyad.

Fayyad died shortly after his appointment and replaced by his brother Hayar. For the next thirty years, Hayar rebelled and reconciled with the Mamluks and during times of rebellion he was often replaced by his brother Zamil and cousin Mu'ayqil ibn Fadl; sometimes the latter two ruled jointly. In 1380, Hayar's son Nu'ayr was appointed amir al-ʿarab. He was dismissed several times for revolting against the sultan's authority by supporting rebel governors in Syria. His last reign ended with his execution in 1406. Nu'ayr's son Ijl had sided against his father and backed Sultan an-Nasir Faraj, who appointed him in place of Nu'ayr. After Ijl was killed by a Mamluk rebel in 1412, the power of the Al Fadl largely diminished. Nonetheless, members of the clan from Hayar's line continued to fill the post of amir al-ʿarab, with Husayn ibn Nu'ayr succeeding Fadl. However, from then on, mentions of the imarat al-ʿarab "in the histories are scanty and confused", according to historian A. S. Tritton. In 1427, Nu'ayr's grandson, Adhra ibn Ali, was killed by his cousin Qirqmas and succeeded by his brother Mudlij ibn Ali, who too was killed by Qirqmas in 1429. Qirqmas died in 1436, though it is not clear if he had been appointed amir al-ʿarab. A grandson of Nu'ayr, Sayf ibn Ali, killed the amir al-ʿarab and his cousin, Sulayman ibn Assaf, in 1480, but was himself killed by Amir ibn Ijl the following year in revenge. Sayf's son was recorded as the amir al-ʿarab in 1496.

=== Ottoman era ===
The Mamluks were driven out of Syria by the Ottoman Turks after the Battle of Marj Dabiq in 1516. The Mamluk-appointed amir al-ʿarab, Mudlij ibn Zahir, a direct descendant of Hayar, was kept in his position by Ottoman sultan, Selim I, after the two met in the aftermath of Marj Dabiq. Mudlij acted as a law unto himself and fought against the Ottoman governor of Damascus, Isa Pasha al-Fanari, in 1530. Mudlij remained amir al-ʿarab until his death in 1538. He was succeeded by his son Zahir, who was killed sometime later by his kinsman Ahmad al-Uradi. The latter was challenged by Zahir's uncles, Dandan and Fayyad, but they were unsuccessful as Ahmad commanded the loyalty of most of the Bedouin tribes.

Ahmad died in 1615 and was succeeded by his son Shadid until he was killed by Zahir's son, Mudlij II. The latter did not gain the imarat al-ʿarab, however, and Shadid was replaced by Fayyad, who held the post until his death in 1618. Afterward, Fayyad's son Husayn was appointed but then Mudlij II was recognized as amir al-ʿarab after he challenged Husayn. Husayn and Mudlij both sought the support of Emir Fakhr ad-Din II, a Druze chieftain of the Banu Ma'an who became a powerful semi-autonomous force in Syria. Husayn was ultimately strangled by the Ottoman governor of Aleppo in 1623, after Mudlij II bribed him. Mudlij II continued serving as amir al-ʿarab for an undetermined length of time.

== List of umara al-ʿarab ==
=== Ayyubid emirs ===
Emir	Reign	Notes
Haditha ibn Ghudayya	ca. 1218–1220s	First amir al-ʿarab, appointed by Sultan al-Adil. Member of Al Fadl branch of Banu Rabi'ah.
Mani' ibn Haditha	1220s–1232	Son of Haditha. Appointed by Sultan al-Kamil and initially shared emirate with his brother Ali ibn Haditha and their kinsman Ghannam ibn Abi Tahir of the Al Faraj branch of Banu Rabi'ah.
Muhanna ibn Mani'	1232–1240	Son of Mani'. Appointed by emirs al-Mujahid Shirkuh II of Homs and al-Ashraf Musa of Damascus.
Tahir ibn Ghannam	1240–	Son of Ghannam. Appointed by Dayfa Khatun, regent of an-Nasir Yusuf of Aleppo.
Abu Bakr ibn Ali	1240–1260	Son of Ali of the Al Ali clan, which became independent from Al Fadl in 1301.

=== Mamluk emirs ===
Emir	Reign	Notes
Isa ibn Muhanna	1261–1284	Son of Muhanna. First Mamluk amir al-arab, appointed by Sultan Baybars, reaffirmed by Sultan Qalawun.
Muhanna ibn Isa	1284–1293	Son of Isa. Appointed by Sultan Qalawun, dismissed and imprisoned by Sultan al-Ashraf Khalil.
Muhammad ibn Abu Bakr	1293–1295	Son of Abu Bakr, appointed by Sultan al-Ashraf Khalil.
Muhanna ibn Isa	1295–1312	Second reign, reappointed by Sultan al-Adil Kitbugha. Later reaffirmed and dismissed by Sultan an-Nasir Muhammad.
Fadl ibn Isa	1312-1317	Appointed by Sultan an-Nasir Muhammad.
Muhanna ibn Isa	1317–1320	Third reign, reappointed by an-Nasir Muhammad.
Muhammad ibn Abu Bakr	1320–1322	Second reign, reappointed by an-Nasir Muhammad.
Fadl ibn Isa	1322–1330	Second reign, appointed by an-Nasir Muhammad.
Muhanna ibn Isa	1330–1335	Fourth reign, reappointed by an-Nasir Muhammad.
Musa ibn Muhanna	1335–1341	Son of Muhanna, appointed by an-Nasir Muhammad.
Sulayman ibn Muhanna	1341–1342	Son of Muhanna.
Isa ibn Fadl	1342–1343	Son of Fadl.
Sayf ibn Fadl	1343–1345	Son of Fadl.
Ahmad ibn Muhanna	1345–1347	Son of Muhanna.
Sayf ibn Fadl	1347–1348	Second reign.
Ahmad ibn Muhanna	1348	Second reign.
Fayyad ibn Muhanna	1348	Son of Muhanna.
Hayar ibn Muhanna	1348–1350	Son of Muhanna.
Fayyad ibn Muhanna	1350–1361	Second reign.
Hayar ibn Muhanna	1361–1364	Second reign; rebelled and was dismissed.
Zamil ibn Musa	1364–1366	Son of Musa.
Hayar ibn Muhanna	1366–1368	Third reign; rebelled and was dismissed.
Zamil ibn Musa	1368	Second reign; rebelled and was dismissed.
Mu'ayqil ibn Fadl	1368–1373	Son of Fadl.
Hayar ibn Muhanna	1373–1375	Fourth reign.
Qara ibn Muhanna	1375–1379	Son of Muhanna.
Zamil ibn Musa	1379–1380	Third reign; ruled with Mu'ayqil.
Nu'ayr ibn Hayar	1380–1383	Son of Hayar.
Zamil	1383–1384	Fourth reign.
Uthman ibn Qara	1384–N/A	Son of Qara.
Musa ibn Assaf	N/A–1396	Son of Assaf, grandson of Muhanna.
Sulayman ibn 'Anqa	1396–1398	Son of 'Anqa, grandson of Muhanna.
Muhammad ibn 'Anqa	1398–1399	Brother of Sulayman ibn 'Anqa.
Nu'ayr ibn Hayar	1399–1406	Second reign.
Ijl ibn Nu'ayr	1406–1412	Son of Nu'ayr.
Husayn ibn Nu'ayr	1412–1414/15	Son of Nu'ayr.
Haditha ibn Sayf	1414/15–ca. 1417	Son of Sayf, grandson of Fadl.
Faraj ibn Nu'ayr	ca. 1417–N/A	Son of Nu'ayr.
Adhra ibn Ali	N/A–1427	Son of Ali, grandson of Nu'ayr.
Mudlij ibn Ali	1427–1429	Brother of Adhra.
Qirqmas	1429–1436	Grandson of Nu'ayr. The killer of both Adhra and Mudlij. Unclear if he was amir al-arab.
Sayf ibn Ali	1480–1481/82	Son of Ali, grandson of Nu'ayr.
Ibn Sayf	1496	Son of Sayf, grandson of Ali.
Mudlij ibn Zahir	N/A–1516	Great-grandson of Ijl. Served during the final years of the Mamluk Sultanate, continued to rule under the Ottomans.

=== Ottoman emirs ===
Emir	Reign	Notes
Mudlij ibn Zahir I	1516–1538	First amir al-ʿarab under the Ottoman Empire, which conquered Syria in 1516. Great-grandson of Ijl ibn Nu'ayr.
Zahir ibn Mudlij	1538–N/A	Son of Mudlij ibn Zahir. Served an undetermined length of time before being killed by Ahmad ibn Haditha.
Ahmad ibn Haditha	N/A–1615	A descendant of Nu'ayr.
Fayyad ibn Zahir	1615–1618	Brother of Mudlij ibn Zahir I.
Husayn ibn Ahmad	1618	Son of Ahmad.
Mudlij ibn Zahir II	1618–N/A	Son of Zahir ibn Mudlij.

== See also ==
- Muqaddam al-Akrad
- Amir al-turkman

== Bibliography ==
- Bakhit, Muhammad Adnan (1982). The Ottoman Province of Damascus in the Sixteenth Century. Librairie du Liban. ISBN 9780866853224.
- Bakhit, Muhammad Adnan (1993). "Muhanna, Banu". In Bosworth, C. E.; et al. (eds.). Encyclopedia of Islam, Volume 7 (2nd ed.). Leiden: Brill. pp. 461–462.
- Hiyari, Mustafa A. (1975). "The Origins and Development of the Amīrate of the Arabs during the Seventh/Thirteenth and Eighth/Fourteenth Centuries". Bulletin of the School of Oriental and African Studies. 38 (3): 509–524. doi:10.1017/s0041977x00048060. JSTOR 613705. S2CID 178868071.
- Northrup, Linda (1998). From Slave to Sultan: The Career of Al-Manṣūr Qalāwūn and the Consolidation of Mamluk Rule in Egypt and Syria (678-689 A.H./1279-1290 A.D.). Franz Steiner Verlag. ISBN 9783515068611.
- Salibi, Kamal S. (1977). Syria Under Islam: Empire on Trial, 634–1097, Volume 1. Delmar: Caravan Books. ISBN 9780882060132.
- Sato, Tsugitaka (1997). State and Rural Society in Medieval Islam: Sultans, Muqtaʻs, and Fallahun. Leiden: Brill. ISBN 90-04-10649-9.
- Tritton, A. S. (1948). "The Tribes of Syria in the Fourteenth and Fifteenth Centuries". Bulletin of the School of Oriental and African Studies. 12 (3/4): 567–573. doi:10.1017/s0041977x00083129. JSTOR 608712. S2CID 161392172.
- Zakkar, Suhayl (1971). The Emirate of Aleppo: 1004–1094. Aleppo: Dar al-Amanah.
