= Fadl ibn Isa =

Emir of Palmyra and Salamiyah
- Reign: 1311/12–1317; 1322–1330
- Predecessor: Muhanna ibn Isa
- Successor: Muhanna ibn Isa

Amir al-ʿarab
- Reign: 1311/12–1317; 1322–1330
- Predecessor: Muhanna ibn Isa
- Successor: Muhanna ibn Isa
- Issue: Isa; Sayf; Mu'ayqil
- House: Al Fadl
- Father: Isa ibn Muhanna

Fadl ibn Isa (Note: Full name and genealogy: Faḍl ibn ʿIsa ibn Muhannā ibn Maniʿ ibn Ḥadītha ibn Ghudayya ibn Faḍl ibn Rabīʿa ibn Ḥaẓim ibn ʿAlī ibn Mufarrij ibn Daghfal ibn al-Jarrāh at-Ṭaʾī), also known as Fadl II, was a prince of the Al Fadl, an Arab dynasty that dominated the Syrian Desert beginning in the 13th century. Between 1311 and 1317, he served as amir al-ʿarab, which gave him authority over the Bedouin tribes of northern Syria on behalf of the Mamluk Sultanate.

== Biography ==
Fadl was a son of Isa ibn Muhanna, the chieftain of the Al Fadl clan, a branch of the Tayyid tribe of Banu Rabi'ah. Beginning with Isa, members of the Al Fadl became the hereditary holders of the office of amir al-ʿarab (commander of the Bedouin) on behalf of the Mamluk Sultanate. After Isa's death in 1284, Fadl's brother Muhanna became amir al-ʿarab with iqta'at (fiefs) in Salamiyah, Palmyra and elsewhere in Syria. When Muhanna fell out with the Mamluk sultan an-Nasir Muhammad in 1311/12 and defected to the Mongol Ilkhanate, the sultan appointed Fadl in his place as amir al-ʿarab.

Though Fadl appeared to oppose Muhanna's defection, the 14th-century Arab historian, al-Umari, noted that the two brothers cooperated in playing the Mamluks and Ilkhanids off of each other for their own interest. He wrote "they were agreed at heart, but openly they were otherwise". Muhanna was restored as amir al-ʿarab in 1317. The following year, Fadl visited Abu Sa'id, the son and successor of the Ilkhanid ruler Öljaitü, to give him a present of Arabian horses in Baghdad. Soon after, it was reported that the Bedouin tribes of al-Ahsa and Qatif drove Fadl out of the region of Basra south of Baghdad.

Muhanna was stripped of the post and exiled with his branch of the family in 1320, after which he was replaced by Muhammad ibn Abu Bakr, a distant relative. In 1322, Fadl was appointed to the post for the second time. During a visit to Salamiyah in 1324, it was apparent that Muhanna still held sway with the Bedouin in Syria while Fadl was the nominal emir who received a government salary. In 1328, Fadl gave Muhanna's son Sulayman substantial sums after the latter defected from the Ilkhanids and agreed to submit to Mamluk authority in al-Rahba. Fadl continued to rule the Bedouin, at least in name, until 1330 when Muhanna was restored. Muhanna died in 1334 and Fadl likely died in the few years before or after Muhanna's death. The office of amir al-ʿarab remained hereditary within the Al Fadl clan, but was primarily held by direct descendants of Muhanna. On some occasions, Fadl's direct descendants held the office, such as his sons Isa (r. 1342–1343) and Sayf (r. 1343–1345, 1347–1348).

== Purported tomb ==
The purported grave of Fadl ibn Isa is in the maqam (shrine) of 'Nabi Barri', located in the village of Barri Sharqi in the vicinity of Salamiyah. The name of 'Fadl ibn Isa ibn Muhanna' was inscribed on a gravestone in the maqam.

== Bibliography ==
- Hiyari, Mustafa A. (1975). "The Origins and Development of the Amīrate of the Arabs during the Seventh/Thirteenth and Eighth/Fourteenth Centuries". Bulletin of the School of Oriental and African Studies. 38 (3): 509–524. doi:10.1017/s0041977x00048060. JSTOR 613705. S2CID 178868071.
- Tritton, A. S. (1948). "The Tribes of Syria in the Fourteenth and Fifteenth Centuries". Bulletin of the School of Oriental and African Studies. 12 (3/4): 567–573. doi:10.1017/s0041977x00083129. JSTOR 608712. S2CID 161392172.
