= Al Fadl =

Historical Arab tribe in Syria

Āl Faḍl Arabic: آل فَضْل
- Bedouin Emirs
- Country: Burid Emirate; Zengid Emirate; Ayyubid Sultanate; Mamluk Sultanate; Ottoman Empire
- Founded: ca. 1107
- Founder: Fadl ibn Rabi'ah
- Titles: Amir al-ʿarab (ca. 1200–17th century); Lord of Salamiyah (1261–early 17th century); Lord of Palmyra (1281–early 17th century)

Al Fadl (Arabic: آل فَضْل, ALA-LC: Āl Faḍl) were an Arab tribe that dominated the Syrian Desert and steppe during the Middle Ages, and whose modern-day descendants largely live in southern Syria and eastern Lebanon. The Al Fadl's progenitor, Fadl ibn Rabi'ah, was a descendant of the Banu Tayy through his ancestor, Mufarrij al-Jarrah. The tribe rose to prominence by assisting the Burids and Zengids against the Crusaders. The Ayyubids often appointed them to the office of amir al-ʿarab, giving the Al Fadl emirs (princes or lords) command over the Bedouin tribes of northern Syria. Their function was often to serve as auxiliary troops.

Starting with Emir Isa ibn Muhanna, the Al Fadl became the hereditary holders of the office by order of the Mamluk sultans and were given substantial iqtaʿat (fiefs) in Salamiyah, Palmyra and other places in the steppe. By then their tribal territory spanned the region between Homs in the west and Qal'at Ja'bar to east, and between the Euphrates valley in the north to central Arabia in the south. Isa's sons and successors Muhanna and Fadl vacillated between the Mamluks and the latter's Mongol enemies, but generally they were highly favored by Sultan an-Nasir Muhammad. During late Mamluk rule, the tribe was occupied by internal strife.

The Ottomans preserved the Al Fadl's hereditary leadership of the Bedouin tribes. By the mid-16th century, the leading emirs joined the Mawali tribe and became known as Al Abu Risha, while their rivals within the tribe were driven out towards the Beqaa Valley and continued to go by the name "Al Fadl". The Mawali dominated northern Syria until the arrival of the Annazah tribesmen in the 18th century. During that same period, the Al Fadl in Beqaa split into the Hourrouk and Fa'our branches. The latter made its home in the Golan Heights where they often fought over pasture rights with Kurdish and Turkmen settlers, and later against Druze and Circassian newcomers.

Toward the end of the 19th century, the Al Fadl became semi-sedentarized; they settled in various Golan villages, but continued to shepherd their flocks, while their emir settled in Damascus and effectively became an absentee landlord who collected rent from his tribesmen. The Al Fadl were displaced from their homes in the Hula Valley and Golan during the 1948 and 1967 Arab-Israeli wars, respectively, and most settled in and around Damascus. As a result of the wars and Syrian agrarian reforms that stripped the emir of much of his land, his relationship with the tribe shifted from benevolent landlord to symbolic leader and political representative. By the 1990s, there were up to 30,000 Al Fadl tribesmen in Syria (not counting those who were affiliated with the Mawali) along with a significant population in eastern Lebanon.

== History ==
=== Origins ===
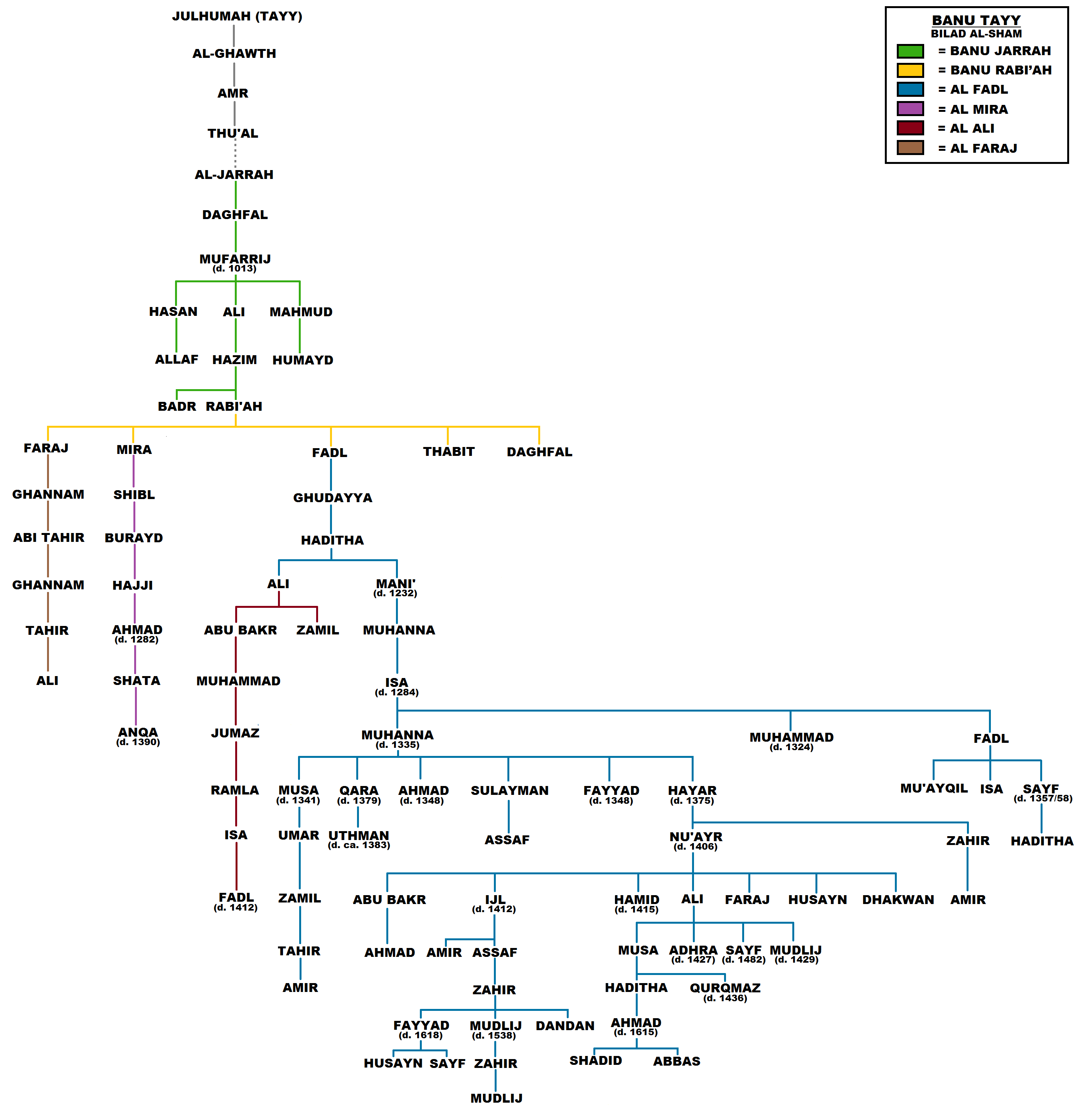
Genealogy of the Banu Tayy tribe of Syria. The Al Fadl branch is depicted by the blue line

The Al Fadl were one of the two main branches (the other being Al Mira) of the Banu Rabi'ah, a tribe belonging to the Banu Tayy (also known as the Tayyids). The Banu Rabi'ah were the offspring of the tribe's namesake, Rabi'ah ibn Hazim ibn Ali ibn Mufarrij ibn Daghfal ibn al-Jarrah. The Banu Rabi'ah were descendants of the 10th-century Jarrahid rulers of Palestine, and became prominent in Syria as a result of their participation in the Muslim war effort against the Crusaders, who conquered the Syrian (Levantine) coastal regions in 1099. The Banu Rabi'ah's branches Al Fadl and Al Mira (also spelled Al Murrah) were the descendants of Rabi'ah's sons, Fadl and Mira, respectively.

Fadl was noted in Muslim chronicles as an emir (prince) of the tribe by 1107. He and his brothers Mira, Thabit and Daghfal, and their father Rabi'ah, provided and commanded mounted auxiliary troops for Tughtekin (r. 1104-1128), the Burid ruler of Damascus, and his Zengid successors. By the time the Zengids gained control of the Syrian interior in the mid-12th century, the Banu Rabi'ah had become the dominant tribe in the Syrian Desert. Relations between the tribes and the various Muslim states were not always cooperative. During periods of strained relations the tribes would plunder the villages of the countryside and Hajj pilgrimage caravans.

The Tayyid roots of the tribe are supported and verified by Muslim historians. However, members of the Al Fadl have claimed fictitious lineages in the past, which have been dismissed by both medieval and modern historians. Among these legends was that the tribe descended from the Barmakids, a Persian household that held high office in the Abbasid government in Baghdad. That claim was disparaged by 14th-century Arab historian Ibn Khaldun. Some modern-era tribesmen have claimed descent from al-Abbas, the Abbasids' namesake and ancestor, and through him trace their lineage to the Quraysh tribe of the Islamic prophet Muhammad. In another story, descent is claimed from Abbasa, a sister of Abbasid caliph Harun al-Rashid.

=== Ayyubid period ===
At some point during Ayyubid rule in the late 12th century or early 13th century, the Al Fadl were driven out of Hauran in southern Syria by the Al Mira. They consequently migrated north to the steppe regions around Homs in northern Syria and were paid by the Ayyubid sultans of Egypt to ensure the safety of the roads connecting Syria with Iraq. The Al Fadl grew more powerful throughout this period due to the patronage of various Ayyubid rulers. Sultan al-Adil (r. 1200–1218) appointed Haditha, a grandson of Fadl ibn Rabi'ah, as amir al-ʿarab (commander of the Bedouin), an office denoting the chief of the Bedouin tribes that were under the jurisdiction of al-Adil and his Ayyubid kinsmen in the Damascus and Hama principalities. The jurisdiction of the amir al-ʿarab was later extended to the tribes around Aleppo by that principality's Ayyubid emir, az-Zahir Ghazi, during the latter half of his reign (1186–1218). Thus, the Bedouin tribes of northern Syria were put under the authority of Haditha; until then, the Banu Kilab had unofficially served as leaders of the northern Syrian tribes in place of their Mirdasid kinsmen.

Following al-Adil's death in 1218, control over the office of amir al-ʿarab regularly switched between different lines of the Al Fadl and Al Faraj, the latter being another sub-tribe of the Banu Rabi'ah. Under Sultan al-Kamil, the emirate (principality) that Haditha ruled was divided between his son Maniʿ and his Al Faraj kinsman Ghannam ibn Abi Tahir ibn Ghannam following Haditha's death (sometime between 1218 and the 1220s). Ghannam was later dismissed by al-Kamil, who concurrently bestowed authority over the entire emirate to Maniʿ for his close cooperation with the Ayyubids of Egypt and Syria and his assistance in their military campaigns. Maniʿ died in 1232/33 and was succeeded by his son Muhanna after being confirmed for the post in an agreement between the respective Ayyubid emirs of Damascus and Homs, al-Ashraf Musa and al-Mujahid Shirkuh II.

Between Muhanna's accession and the Mamluk conquest of Syria in 1260, details about the Al Fadl/Tayyid emirate are obscure or absent in the Muslim sources. It is known that in 1240 Tahir ibn Ghannam of the Al Faraj was made amir al-ʿarab by the Ayyubid emir of Aleppo, an-Nasir Yusuf, and that sometime later Ali ibn Hadithah of the Al Fadl (Muhanna's uncle) was given the post, which he held until the Mamluks' ascent. According to historian Reuven Amitai-Preiss, it was not Ali but his son and successor Abu Bakr who was appointed amir al-ʿarab in the years just prior to the Mamluks' annexation of Syria.

=== Mamluk period ===
The office of amir al-ʿarab passed to Muhanna's son Sharaf ad-Din ʿIsa, though it is not clear which Mamluk sultan bestowed the title upon him. According to several Mamluk-era sources, Sultan Qutuz (r. 1259–1260) appointed ʿIsa in the aftermath of the Mamluk victory over the Mongols at the Battle of Ayn Jalut. However the 14th-century Arab historian al-ʿUmari claims Qutuz's successor Baybars made ʿIsa amir al-ʿarab. This was apparently a reward for ʿIsa's aid and friendship during Baybars' exile in Syria in the 1250s at a time when Abu Bakr's father Ali denied him refuge. Whatever the correct version, Baybars at least confirmed ʿIsa's appointment and his iqtaʿat (fiefs) in 1260/61. Abu Bakr's brother Zamil and Tahir ibn Ghannam's son Ahmad both contested ʿIsa's appointment. The latter requested a share in the emirate, but Baybars gave him a smaller emirate elsewhere in Syria instead, while Zamil revolted to gain full control of ʿIsa's emirate. Zamil was defeated by ʿIsa and the Mamluks and was imprisoned in Cairo. He was later released and a temporary peace was mediated between him, ʿIsa and other emirs of the Banu Rabi'ah. ʿIsa's strongest Bedouin opposition came from his kinsmen in the Al Mira under the leadership of Ahmad ibn Hajji, who dominated the tribes of southern Syria. Gradually, the enmity between the Al Fadl and the Al Mira dissipated as Ahmad was given virtual independence in the southern desert, while ʿIsa remained amir al-ʿarab.

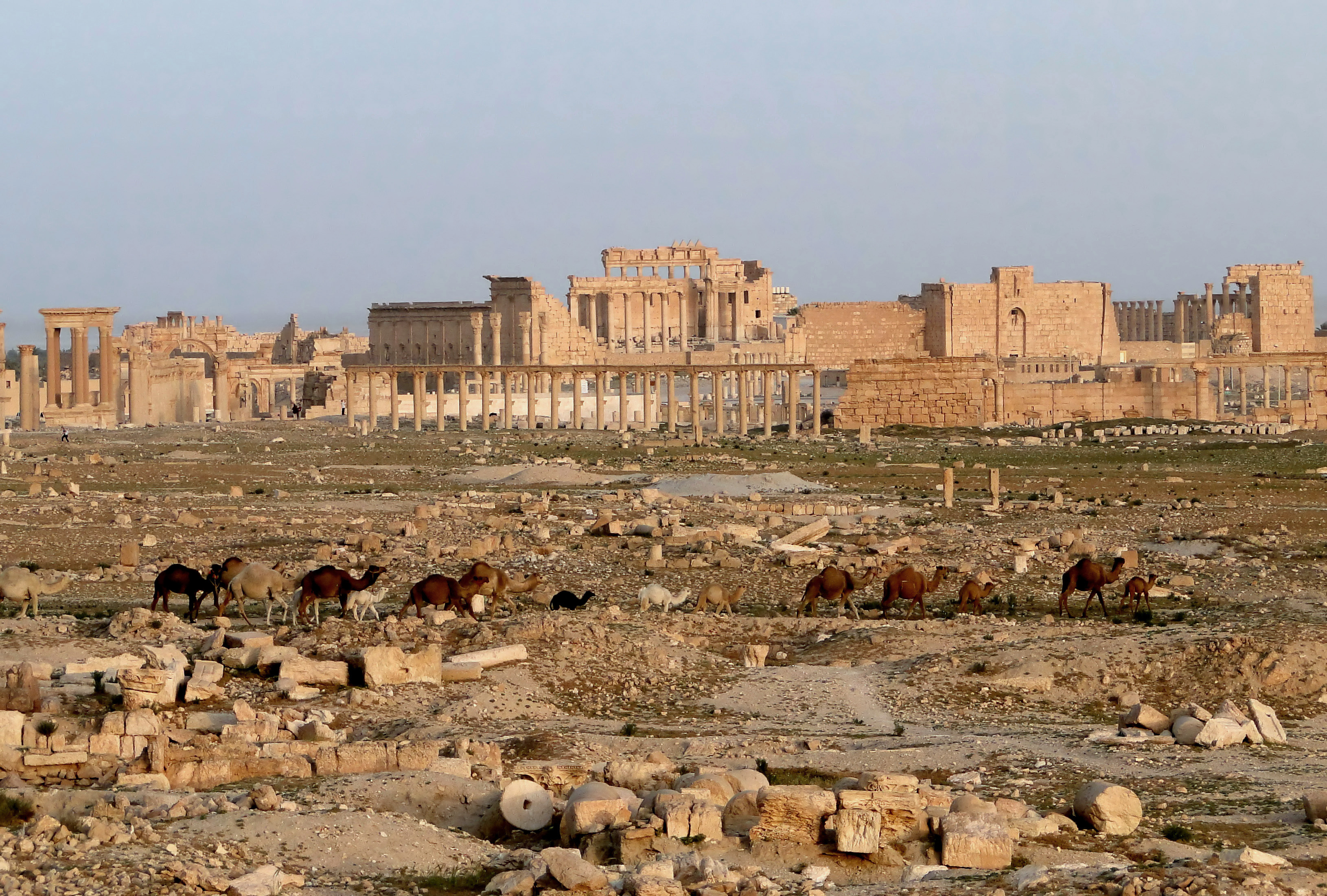
Palmyra became a hereditary iqtaʿ (fief) of the Al Fadl in 1281 under Emir Isa ibn Muhanna. It remained under the tribe's control at least through the 17th century

During the Mamluk era, the Al Fadl's territory spanned the area between Homs in the west to Qal'at Ja'bar in the northeast and all along the Euphrates valley through the countryside of Basra southward to the Washm region in central Najd. Mamluk patronage of the Al Fadl enabled them to dominate the other Bedouin tribes of the Syrian Desert. A rival sub-branch of Al Fadl, the Al ʿAli, controlled the Ghouta region of Damascus and the northern Arabian regions of Tayma and al-Jawf, while Al Mira controlled the area of Jawlan southward to the al-Harrah hot springs in Hejaz. Other branches of the Banu Tayy controlled regions within the Banu Rabi'ah's territory. Among them were the Shammar and Banu Lam in the north Arabian mountains of Jabal Ajaʾ and Jabal Salma.

The wealth and power of the Al Fadl allowed them to reside near inhabited areas, rather than depend on pasturage in the desert. Their leaders were entrusted by Baybars and his successors with protecting Syria up to the borders with Ilkhanid-held Iraq (the Ilkhanids were Mongol enemies of the Mamluks). In exchange for protecting the Syrian frontier and aiding the Mamluks as auxiliary troops, the Al Fadl and some of their Banu Rabi'ah kin were bestowed with official assignments, iqtaʿat and gifts. While the Mamluk sultans cultivated an alliance with the Al Fadl, they generally considered the tribe to be "vacillating and untrustworthy", according to historian Janusz Bylinsky. Nonetheless, the Al Fadl were the most favored Bedouin tribe in Syria and their leaders consistently held the title of amir al-ʿarab and were given official receptions by Mamluk sultans.

Toward the end of ʿIsa's reign, in 1281, Palmyra was granted to the Al Fadl as an iqtaʿ, and it became one of the tribe's principal towns and sources of income, along with Salamiyah. The Al Fadl became patrons of public works in Palmyra and played a significant role in regulating the town's affairs. The central mosque of Palmyra contains inscriptions either attributing the Al Fadl with the mosque's construction or other works in Palmyra. A mosque built at the town's periphery has been attributed to the Al Fadl, and was likely constructed for use by the Bedouin as opposed to the settled population in the town itself.

When ʿIsa died in 1284, he was succeeded by his son Muhanna. He and his brother Fadl ruled the emirate for nearly half a century with two interruptions. The first was when Qalawun's successor, Sultan al-Ashraf Khalil, had them and their sons imprisoned in Cairo. Their cousin, Muhammad ibn Abu Bakr (grandson of Ali ibn Haditha) presided over the emirate until Muhanna was reinstalled in 1295, after al-Ashraf Khalil's death. Muhanna's allegiance vacillated between the Mamluks and the Ilkhanids between 1311 and 1330, after which he became firmly loyal to the Mamluk sultan, an-Nasir Muhammad. He died five years later and for the next seventy years, his sons and grandsons held the post with occasional interruptions during which Fadl's offspring or distant cousins were appointed.

=== Ottoman era ===
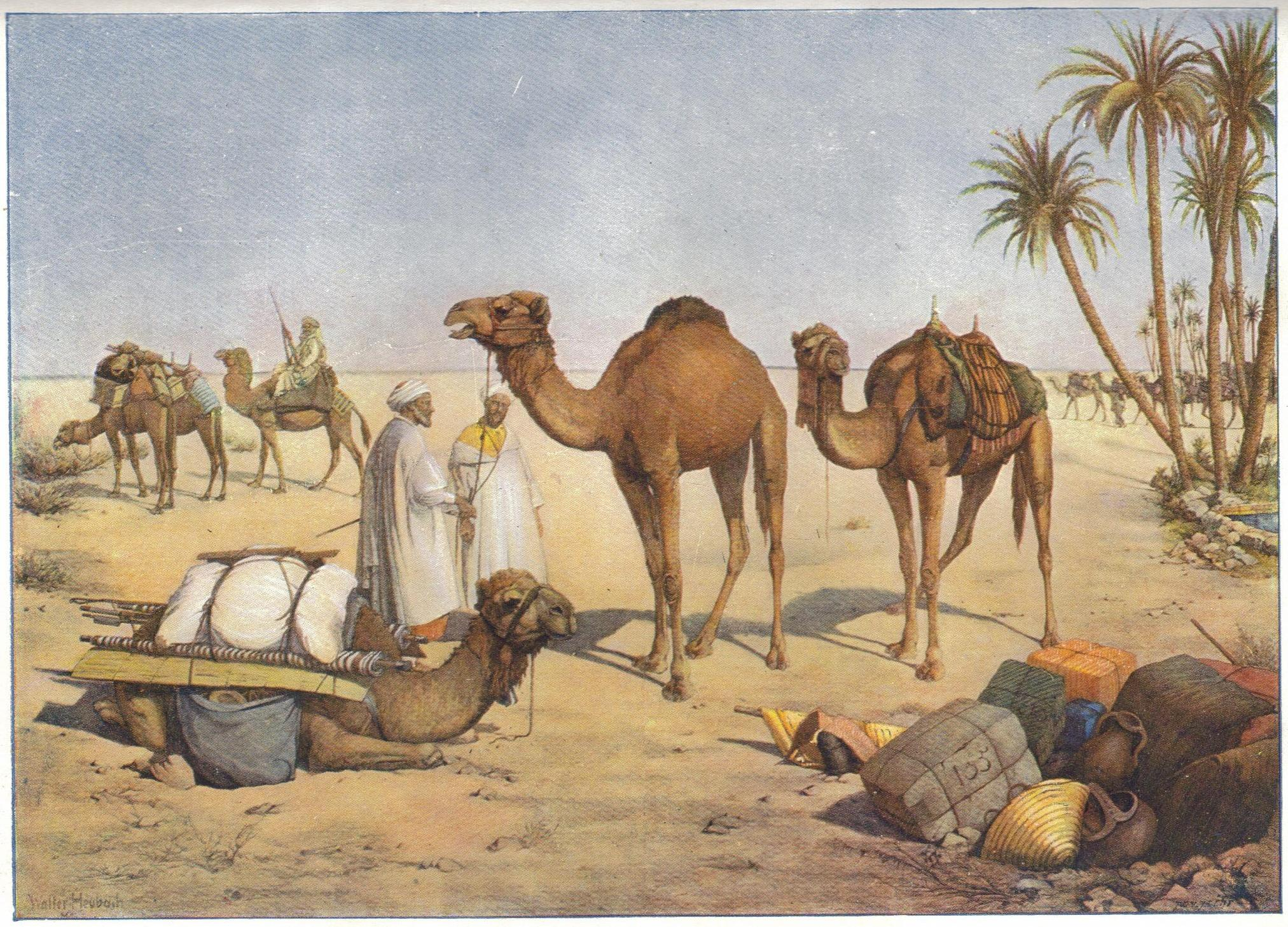
During Ottoman rule, the Al Fadl chieftains continued to hold the post of amir al-ʿarab and were obliged to provide over 1,000 camels to the sultan each year.

The Ottomans conquered Syria in 1516. They preserved the office of amir al-ʿarab as a hereditary post of the Al Fadl, via the Salamiyah-based descendants of Hayar, throughout the 16th and 17th centuries. The amir al-ʿarab under the last Mamluk sultan was Mudlij ibn Zahir ibn Assaf, a great-great-grandson of Hayar. He served under the Ottomans until his death in 1538. In place of the traditional iqtaʿat granted to the preeminent Al Fadl emir, the Ottomans granted them a timar (income-producing land grant). In return, the emir provided 1,050 camels (each worth 200 akçe) and 30 young horses (each worth 1,000 akçe) annually to the Ottomans, which formed part of the sultan's revenue from Damascus Eyalet (Damascus Province).

The descendants of Hayar came to be known as Al Abu Risha, which means "[house of] the father of the plume". They acquired this name in 1574 when their emir was officially recognized by the Ottomans as the hereditary amir al-ʿarab and adorned with a plume-crowned turban to consecrate his official status. The Al Abu Risha took over leadership of the Mawali tribal confederation, whose member tribes, many of whom were descended from non-Arab slaves, were not necessarily related to each other through blood ties. The Ottomans entrusted Al Abu Risha with protecting the caravan and Hajj pilgrimage routes of northern Syria in exchange for an annual salary. Under the leadership of the Abu Risha emirs, the Mawali drove out rival Al Fadl sheikhs and their families from northern Syria. The latter consequently migrated to the Beqaa Valley. The Fadl tribesmen who remained became part of the Mawali confederation like their Abu Risha kinsmen. The Mawali were the dominant tribe of northern Syria until the invasions of Anazzah tribesmen throughout the 18th century.

According to Fadl al-Fa'our, the author of a 1963 dissertation about his tribe, the Al Fadl tribesmen who fled to the Beqaa split into two factions in the 18th century as a result of a feud with the Bani Khalid tribe. One of the factions, led by its emir, Fa'our, migrated to the Golan Heights (known in Arabic as Jawlan). This emir is the namesake and ancestor of Beit Fa'our, the Al Fadl household that has since led the tribe. The Fadl tribesmen who stayed in Beqaa were the Hourrouk branch, which continues to inhabit the Beqaa. The lines of descent connecting the Fa'our and Hourrouk branches with the Mamluk-era Al Fadl emirs has not been specifically defined. For much of the 18th and 19th centuries, the Al Fadl used the Golan Heights as a grazing area for their flocks, along with the Banu Nu'aym tribe. They successfully fought off Turkmen and Kurdish groups in the Golan Heights for control of pasture lands. Later, in the 1870s, Circassians from other parts of the empire settled in the Golan Heights, and their cultivation of the land threatened the Al Fadl's traditional pasture grounds. At the time, the tribe's presence in the area consisted of 320 tents along with several villages which they inhabited in the winter. They fought a number of skirmishes with the Circassians, during which one of their leaders, Sheikh Shadadi al-Fadl was killed.

By 1887, peace was established between the Al Fadl and their Circassian and Druze rivals as a result of Ottoman recognition of the tribe's pasture rights and territorial boundaries. As a result, the territory of the Fa'our branch of the Al Fadl included large parts of the Golan Heights, part of the Hauran plain, and the eastern Hula Valley. These lands were registered in the name of the emir, who thereafter collected rent from its tenants. Most of the tenants were Fadl tribesmen who had shifted from a nomadism to a semi-sedentism that combined agriculture and grazing. The emir, who resided in Damascus, was in effect an absentee landlord, and he and his immediate family became wealthy members of the Damascene social elite. The emir married a woman from the well-known Kurdish Damascene family, Buzu. Some Kurdish families, including the Buzu, were afterward incorporated into Al Fadl. Despite the absence of blood relations, the newer households held great pride and respect for their association with the tribe's leading household, the Fa'our.

=== Modern era ===
During the 1948 Arab–Israeli War, several of the Al Fadl's lands in the Hula Valley were captured by Israel while their other lands in the valley became part of demilitarized no-man's lands. Their territory in the Golan Heights, near the armistice lines with Israel, came under the control of the Syrian military authorities, who viewed the emir of the Al Fadl as a security threat. They thus forbade him from traveling outside of Damascus. The loss of land in 1948–49 and the travel restrictions imposed on him led to a shift in the emir's power relations with the rest of the tribe. He lost substantial rent income as a result of the land loss and was unable to collect the rent money from his remaining lands. Instead, some tribal elders in the Golan Heights traveled to Damascus to pay the emir, but they did so in decreasing numbers every year.

By 1958, the power of the Al Fadl's emir, Fa'our al-Fa'our, was greatly reduced as a result of his lands being confiscated in the agrarian reforms initiated during the United Arab Republic period in Syria. Land rent was Fa'ours main source of income and with its loss, he was no longer able to wield power over his tribesmen and continue the tradition of distributing wealth to lesser-ranking members of the tribe.

Fa'ours leadership role was resuscitated after an incident in 1960 in which his car broke down, forcing him to seek assistance from the nearest village inhabited by his tribesmen. The sight of the emir being forced to walk while all other tribal leaders drove trucks provoked a sense of dishonor among the tribesmen of the village, who launched efforts to pool funds from Al Fadl's members to buy a new car for Fa'our. Some tribesmen sent sheep and goats as compensatory gifts to Fa'our as well. The reaction of the tribesmen to his dire financial situation spurred Fa'our, who was based in Beirut, to reassert his political leadership of Al Fadl. To that end, he increased contacts with his tribesmen and negotiated on their behalf.

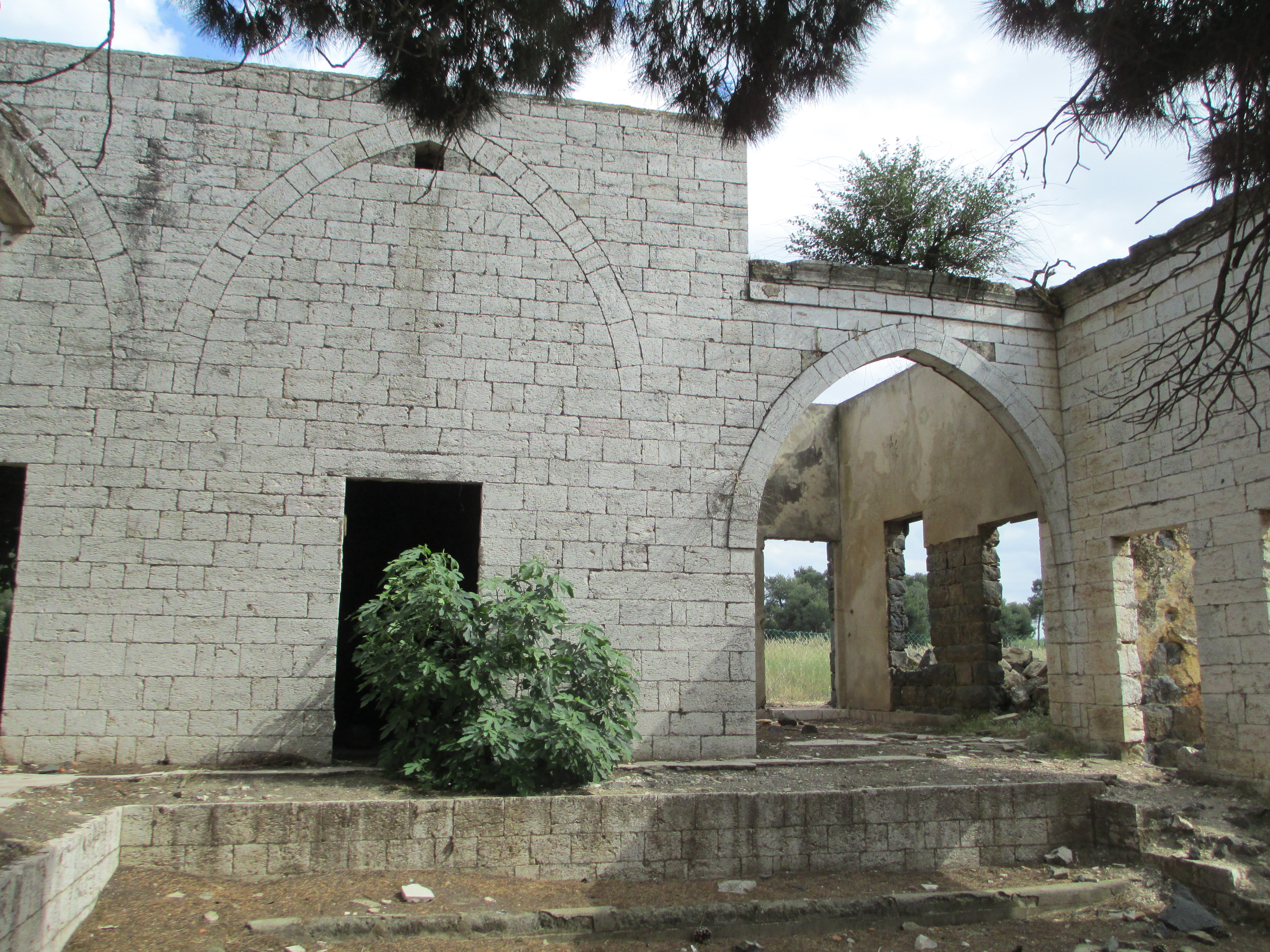
The palace of Emir Mahmoud AlFaour of Al Fadl in the Golan Heights. Fadl tribesmen had their villages and grazing grounds in the Golan Heights until the area was occupied by Israel during the Six-Day War in 1967.

In 1964–1965, Faour secured permission for his tribesmen in the Beqaa in Lebanon to purchase land in the Anti-Lebanon Mountains. The Beqaa tribesmen were not Lebanese citizens and thus not allowed to purchase land, but Fa'ours intercession with Interior Minister Kamal Jumblatt enabled them to acquire the land nonetheless. This success symbolized the change in the Al Fadl emir's traditional role, whereby he was no longer a wealthy benefactor and landlord of his tribesmen, but rather a political leader who represented their interests. In addition, the Al Fadl emirs maintain a symbolic and moral legitimacy within the tribe based on their unproven claim of descent from Abbas and the Quraysh tribe.

After Israel's capture and occupation of the Golan in the 1967 Six-Day War, the Al Fadl of Golan were entirely displaced. Following the war, most members of the tribe settled in and around Damascus. In the city itself, they were concentrated in the Masakin Barzeh, Qaboun and Dweil'a quarters. After several years, many tribesmen left the city to settle in nearby suburbs, chiefly Qatana, but also Muadimiyah, Jdeidat Artouz and Artouz. Jdeidat al-Fadl, a working-class suburb of Jdeidat Artuz, is mostly populated by descendants of the Al Fadl. To a lesser extent, Fadl tribesmen have settled in al-Kiswah and in villages near the border with the occupied portion of the Golan, such as Sa'sa' and neighboring villages.

In the 1970s, Fa'our began efforts to acquire pasture lands in Saudi Arabia for some of his tribesmen displaced from the Golan, which entailed regular commuting between Beirut and the tribal council of King Khalid in Riyadh. By the 1980s and early 1990s, the Al Fadl's estimated numbers were between 20,000 and 30,000 (they were not counted in the Syrian census of 1981). Other than Syria, some members of the tribe immigrated to Lebanon, namely to villages in the Beqaa and the Anti-Lebanon Mountains. A number of these refugees were given Lebanese citizenship in 1994.

== List of Al Fadl emirs ==
Emir	Reign	Notes
Fadl I	ca. 1107	A direct descendant of Mufarrij ibn Daghfal ibn al-Jarrah. Progenitor of the Al Fadl.
Haditha	ca. 1218–1220s	Grandson of Fadl ibn Rabi'ah. First member of dynasty appointed to the Ayyubid office of amir al-ʿarab.
Mani'	1220s–1232	Son of Haditha.
Muhanna I	1232–1240	Son of Mani'.
Ali	1240–1260	Son of Haditha, progenitor of the Al Ali branch of Al Fadl.
Isa I	1261–1284	Appointed as a reward for aiding the Mamluks. First member to rule under the Mamluks.
Muhanna II	1284–1293	Imprisoned by the Mamluks.
Muhammad ibn Abu Bakr	1293–1295	Grandson of Ali ibn Haditha, appointed in place of Muhanna.
Muhanna II	1295–1312	Second reign.
Fadl II	1312-1317	Brother of Muhanna.
Muhanna II	1317–1320	Expelled with his tribe.
Muhammad ibn Abu Bakr	1320–1322	Second reign.
Fadl II	1322–1330	Second reign.
Muhanna II	1330–1335	Fourth reign.
Musa	1335–1341	Son of Muhanna.
Sulayman I	1341–1342	Son of Muhanna.
Isa II	1342–1343	Son of Fadl ibn Isa.
Sayf	1343–1345	Son of Fadl ibn Isa.
Ahmad	1345–1347	Son of Muhanna.
Sayf	1347–1348	Second reign.
Ahmad	1348	Second reign.
Fayyad	1348	Son of Muhanna.
Hayar	1348–1350	Son of Muhanna.
Fayyad	1350–1361	Second reign.
Hayar	1361–1364	Second reign; rebelled and was dismissed.
Zamil	1364–1366	Son of Muhanna's brother Musa.
Hayar	1366–1368	Third reign; rebelled and was dismissed.
Zamil	1368	Second reign; rebelled and was dismissed.
Mu'ayqil	1368–1373	Son of Fadl ibn Isa.
Hayar	1373–1375	Fourth reign.
Qara	1375–1379	Son of Muhanna.
Zamil	1379–1380	Third reign; ruled with Mu'ayqil.
Mu'ayqil	1379–1380	Second reign; ruled with Zamil.
Nu'ayr	1380–1383	Son of Hayar.
Zamil	1383–1384	Fourth reign.
Uthman	1384–	Son of Qara.
Musa	–1396	Son of Hayar's brother Assaf.
Sulayman II	1396–1398	Son of Hayar's brother 'Anqa.
Muhammad ibn Anqa	1398–1399	Brother of Sulayman II.
Nu'ayr	1399–1406	Second reign.
Ijl	1406–1412	Son of Nu'ayr.
Husayn	1412–1414/15	Son of Nu'ayr.
Haditha II	1414/15–ca. 1417	Son of Sayf ibn Fadl.
Faraj	ca. 1417–	Son of Nu'ayr.
Adhra	–1427	Grandson of Nu'ayr.
Mudlij I	1427–1429	Grandson of Nu'ayr, brother of Adhra.
Qirqmas	1429–1436	Grandson of Nu'ayr. The killer of both Adhra and Mudlij. Unclear if he was amir al-arab.
Sayf II	1480–1481/82	Grandson of Nu'ayr.
Ibn Sayf	1496	Son of Sayf II.
Mudlij II	–1538	Great-grandson of Ijl. Served during the final years of the Mamluk Sultanate, continued to rule under the Ottomans.

== Bibliography ==
- Amitai-Preiss, Reuven (1995). Mongols and Mamluks: The Mamluk-Ilkhanid War, 1260-1281. Cambridge: Cambridge University Press. ISBN 0-521-46226-6.
- Bakhit, Muhammad Adnan (1982). The Ottoman Province of Damascus in the Sixteenth Century. Librairie du Liban. ISBN 9780866853224.
- Bylinski, Janusz (1999). "Qal'at Shirkuh at Palmyra: A Medieval Fortress Reinterpreted". Bulletin d'études orientales. 51. Institut Francais du Proche-Orient: 151–208. JSTOR 41608461.
- Chatty, Dawn (2010). Displacement and Dispossession in the Modern Middle East. Cambridge University Press. ISBN 978-0-521-81792-9.
- Chatty, Dawn. "Land, Leaders and Limousines: Political and Moral Authority". Oxford University.
- Hiyari, Mustafa A. (1975). "The Origins and Development of the Amīrate of the Arabs during the Seventh/Thirteenth and Eighth/Fourteenth Centuries". Bulletin of the School of Oriental and African Studies. 38 (3): 509–524. doi:10.1017/s0041977x00048060. JSTOR 613705. S2CID 178868071.
- Tritton, A. S. (1948). "The Tribes of Syria in the Fourteenth and Fifteenth Centuries". Bulletin of the School of Oriental and African Studies. 12 (3/4): 567–573. doi:10.1017/s0041977x00083129. JSTOR 608712. S2CID 161392172.
- Van der Steen, Eveline (2013). Near Eastern Tribal Societies During the Nineteenth Century: Economy, Society and Politics Between Tent and Town. Equinox. ISBN 978-1-908049-83-4.
