= Isa ibn Muhanna =

Emir of the Al Fadl Bedouin during the 13th century

Amir al-ʿarab
- Reign: 1260–1284
- Predecessor: Ali ibn Haditha
- Successor: Muhanna ibn Isa

Lord of Palmyra
- Reign: 1281–1284
- Predecessor: N/A
- Successor: Muhanna ibn Isa
- Died: May 1284
- Issue: Muhanna; Fadl; Muhammad
Names
- Sharaf ad-Din ʿIsa ibn Muhanna ibn Maniʿ ibn Haditha ibn Fadl ibn Rabiʿah ibn Hazim ibn ʿAli ibn Mufarrij ibn Daghfal ibn al-Jarrah at-Taʾi
- House: Al Fadl
- Father: Muhanna ibn Maniʿ
- Religion: Islam

Sharaf ad-Din Isa ibn Muhanna at-Ta'i, (Note: Full name and genealogy: Sharaf ad-Dīn ʿIsa ibn Muhannā ibn Maniʿ ibn Ḥadītha ibn Ghudayya ibn Faḍl ibn Rabīʿa ibn Ḥaẓim ibn ʿAlī ibn Mufarrij ibn Daghfal ibn al-Jarrāh at-Ṭaʾī) better known as Isa ibn Muhanna (d. 1284/85), was an Arab emir (commander/prince) of the Al Fadl, a Bedouin dynasty that dominated the Syrian Desert and steppe during the 13th–15th centuries. He was appointed amir al-ʿarab (commander of the Bedouin) by the Mamluks after their conquest of Syria in 1260. Isa's father served the same post under the Ayyubids. His assignment gave him command over the nomadic Arab tribes of Syria and obliged him to provide auxiliary troops in times of war and guard the desert frontier from the Mongol Ilkhanate in Iraq. As part of his emirate, he was granted Salamiyah and Sarmin. He participated in numerous campaigns against the Mongol Ilkhanate on behalf of the Mamluks during Sultan Baybars' reign (1260–1277).

In 1279/80, Isa defected from Baybars' successor, Qalawun, and joined the rebellion of the Mamluk viceroy of Syria, Sunqur al-Ashqar. However, Isa dissuaded Sunqur from joining the Ilkhanids' army, and was dismissed from his post when Qalawun's forces suppressed the rebellion. Isa was reinstalled by 1280, and in the following year, played a decisive role as a commander in the Mamluk victory over the Ilkhanate at the Second Battle of Homs. After his death, Isa was succeeded by his son Muhanna, and throughout the 14th century, Isa's direct descendants held the office of amir al-ʿarab with occasional interruption.

== Ancestry ==
Isa's clan, the Al Fadl, were direct descendants of the Jarrahid ruler of Palestine, Mufarrij ibn Daghfal (d. 1013), himself a member of the ancient tribe of Tayy; Isa's laqab was "Sharaf ad-Din al-Tayyi", denoting his Tayyid roots. By the early 13th century, the Al Fadl dominated the desert region between Homs in the west to the Euphrates valley in the east and from Qal'at Ja'bar southward through central Najd. Isa's great-grandfather, Haditha (grandson of the Al Fadl's progenitor, Fadl ibn Rabi'ah), served as the first amir al-ʿarab (commander of the Bedouin tribes) under Ayyubid sultan al-Adil (r. 1200–1218), beginning a tradition of Al Fadl tribesmen being appointed to the office. Isa's father Muhanna and grandfather Mani (d. 1232) both served the post.

== Amir al-ʿarab ==
It is not evident in medieval Muslim sources when Muhanna died or when the post of amir al-ʿarab was stripped from him. It is known for certain that prior to the Mamluk conquest of Syria in 1260, the amir al-ʿarab was Muhanna's uncle Ali ibn Haditha. The circumstances of Isa's replacement of Ali are also unclear. In some versions, Isa was appointed by Sultan Qutuz as a reward for his support in the Battle of Ain Jalut against the Mongols in the latter half of 1260, though the sources indicate that Isa and his Bedouin horsemen refrained from actually participating in the battle. In another version, Qutuz's successor Baybars appointed Isa as a reward for assisting him during his 1250s exile in Syria (in this version, Ali was stripped of the title as punishment for denying Baybars refuge). In any case, it is known that Baybars issued a diploma confirming Isa as amir al-ʿarab and recognizing his iqtaʿat (fiefs) in 1260/61. Among his iqta'at were half of Salamiyah, which was separated from the iqtaʿ of Hama, and Sarmin. Baybars also entrusted the Al Fadl and the other Bedouin tribes of the Syrian desert and steppe with guarding the Syrian frontier with Mongol Ilkhanid-held Iraq.

=== Service with Baybars ===
Isa's relations with Baybars were generally on good terms, though there were occasional exceptions. Following the Mongol destruction of the Abbasid Caliphate of Baghdad in 1258, two Abbasid princes escaped; Abu al-'Abbas (later known as al-Hakim), was the first to reach Syria under Isa's protection. However, the second surviving prince, Abu al-Qasim (known by the regnal name al-Mustansir), was chosen by Baybars and inaugurated as the Abbasid caliph in Cairo. (Note: The last traditional Abbasid caliph was killed by the Mongols in 1258 when they sacked Baghdad, but Baybars reestablished the caliphate in Cairo by installing al-Mustansir, a member of the extended Abbasid family) Isa accompanied al-Mustansir on his Mamluk-sponsored campaign to reclaim Iraq from the Mongols. However, al-Mustansir was killed en route to Baghdad in a Mongol ambush in October 1261. The next year, Isa was present in Cairo to bear witness that al-Mustansir's successor and kinsman, al-Hakim, was indeed a member of the Abbasid line.

Isa's assignment to the post was opposed by some of his kinsmen from the start. The strongest opposition came from Ahmad ibn Hajji of the Al Mira, relatives of the Al Fadl through their shared ancestor Rabi'ah ibn Hazim, whose descendants were collectively known as the Banu Rabi'ah. Ahmad ibn Hajji and his tribe were considered by the historians of their day as the kings of the Arabs (muluk al-ʿarab) of the southern Syrian Desert, and Ahmad ibn Hajji led the struggle against Isa for the official post of amir al-ʿarab. Their conflict dissipated as the Mamluks gave the Al Mira virtual independence in the southern desert, while maintaining Isa as amir al-ʿarab. Isa also faced opposition from Ahmad ibn Tahir ibn Ghannam, another distant relative from the Banu Rabi'ah, and from his Al Fadl kinsman Zamil ibn Ali ibn Haditha. The latter coveted the post, viewing himself as the rightful heir to the office that had been held by his father. In his conflict with Isa, Zamil was defeated, imprisoned, then released after a reconciliation between the chieftains of the Banu Rabi'ah in 1264. Ahmad ibn Tahir, whose demand of a share in Isa's emirate was denied by Baybars, desisted from further opposition when he was given a smaller emirate elsewhere in Syria. In early 1265, Isa was dispatched by Baybars to lead a raid against Ilkhanid-held Harran as a diversion for a Mamluk expedition aimed at relieving their Anatolian fortress of al-Birah from an Ilkhanid siege; al-Birah's defenders withstood the siege and the Ilkhanids retreated in haste with the arrival of Mamluk forces in February.

In 1268/69, Baybars took hostage some of the Bedouin chieftains' sons as leverage to ensure that their fathers did not defect to the Ilkhanids. That same year, he halved Isa's annual grant of 130,000 silver dirhams. Baybars' actions backfired when Isa made it apparent that he would defect to the Ilkhanids; the Bedouin tribes' defection to the Ilkhanids was a constant possibility and gave Isa considerable leverage with Baybars. News of this turn of events prompted Baybars to secretly rush to Syria from Egypt on 15 September 1270 and secure Isa's commitment to the Mamluks. He arrived in Hama on 4 October and summoned Isa. During the meeting, Baybars asked Isa whether rumors of his planned defection were true and Isa answered in the affirmative. Afterward, Baybars honored him and agreed to free the hostages, restore Isa's grant, and distribute to the Bedouin tribes large amounts of wheat. As a result, Isa swore an oath of loyalty to Baybars and afterward participated in every Mamluk campaign against the Ilkhanids. The first of these campaigns occurred soon after Isa's meeting with Baybars, when he led raids against the Ilkhanids in Edessa and Harran in southern Anatolia.

In 1273, Isa led raids against Ilkhanid-held Anbar in western Iraq on orders from Baybars, possibly to divert Ilkhanid forces from an expedition against Syria. Mongols in Anbar defeat Isa and Isa retreats Months later, in March 1274, Isa's forces confronted a group of Khafaja Bedouin in Anbar, though there was no conclusive victory after a daylong battle. Isa commanded a contingent of Baybars' army in the 1277 campaign against the Mongols at the Battle of Elbistan. He visited Egypt later that year with Ahmad ibn Hajji, and the two were well received by Baybars.

=== Career during Qalawun's reign ===
Baybars died in July 1277 and was succeeded by his sons who ruled in name only while Baybars' closest subordinate, Qalawun, acted as strongman. Qalawun usurped the throne in 1279 and soon after faced a rebellion by his viceroy in Syria, Sunqur al-Ashqar, who was joined by Isa. The Ilkhanids and their Armenian and Georgian allies took advantage of the intra-Mamluk strife and an invitation by Sunqur to invade Syria, and sacked Aleppo. Isa reprimanded Sunqur for inciting the Muslims' enemies to attack and urged him not to betray Islam in his late age. Isa persuaded Sunqur not to join the Ilkhanids and the latter escaped Qalawun's advancing army. Isa also sought to evade Qalawun's troops and barricaded himself in the desert fortress of al-Rahba. He was replaced by his relative Muhammad ibn Abu Bakr as punishment by Qalawun for supporting Sunqur's revolt. Muhammad's appointment was likely in name only, and in any case, Isa reconciled with Qalawun by 1280, when the sultan received him in Cairo.

During the Second Battle of Homs between the Mamluks and the Ilkhanids in October 1281, Isa commanded the right flank of the Mamluk army. Under his command were the horsemen of Al Fadl, Al Mira and Banu Kilab among other Syrian tribes. During the course of the battle, the Mamluk right held firm against the Ilkhanid right's assault and then the Mamluk divisions (excluding Isa's right flank) led a joint counterattack against the Ilkhanid right. It was during this counterattack that Isa's forces mounted a major assault against the Ilkhanid left ending in a rout. Afterward, the Mamluk divisions destroyed the Ilkhanid center and forced the latter's retreat, resulting in a decisive Mamluk victory. Isa was praised in Mamluk histories of the battle for securing the Mamluk victory. In reward for his performance, he was made the lord of Palmyra in late 1281.

== Death and legacy ==
Isa died in May 1284. He was succeeded by his son Muhanna ibn Isa, who inherited his emirate, and became the lord of the ancient oasis town of Palmyra. For the next quarter century, Muhanna and another of Isa's sons, Fadl, held the office of amir al-ʿarab with minor interruptions. Isa's branch of the Al Fadl dynasty, sometimes referred to as "Al Isa", served the office through much of the 14th century.

== Bibliography ==
- Aigle, Denise (2015). The Mongol Empire Between Myth and Reality: Studies in Anthropological History. Iran Studies. Vol. 11. Leiden: Brill. ISBN 978-9-004-28064-9. ISSN 1569-7401.
- Amitai-Preiss, Reuven (1995). Mongols and Mamluks: The Mamluk-Ilkhanid War, 1260–1281. Cambridge: Cambridge University Press. ISBN 0-521-46226-6.
- Hiyari, Mustafa A. (1975). "The Origins and Development of the Amīrate of the Arabs during the Seventh/Thirteenth and Eighth/Fourteenth Centuries". Bulletin of the School of Oriental and African Studies. 38 (3): 509–524. doi:10.1017/s0041977x00048060. JSTOR 613705. S2CID 178868071.
- Northrup, Linda (1998). From Slave to Sultan: The Career of Al-Manṣūr Qalāwūn and the Consolidation of Mamluk Rule in Egypt and Syria (678–689 A.H./1279-1290 A.D.). Franz Steiner Verlag. ISBN 9783515068611.
- Northrup, Linda S. (1998). "The Bahri Mamluk sultanate". In Petry, Carl F. (ed.). The Cambridge History of Egypt, Vol. 1: Islamic Egypt 640–1517. Cambridge University Press. ISBN 9780521068857.
- Sato, Tsugitaka (1997). State and Rural Society in Medieval Islam: Sultans, Muqtaʻs, and Fallahun. Leiden: Brill. ISBN 90-04-10649-9.
- Tritton, A. S. (1948). "The Tribes of Syria in the Fourteenth and Fifteenth Centuries". Bulletin of the School of Oriental and African Studies. 12 (3/4): 567–573. doi:10.1017/s0041977x00083129. JSTOR 608712. S2CID 161392172.
