= Iqta' =

Islamic practice of tax farming

An iqta (Arabic: إقطاع, romanized: iqṭāʿ) and occasionally iqtaʿa (Arabic: إقطاعة) was an Islamic practice of farming out tax revenues yielded by land granted temporarily to army officials in place of a regular wage; it became common in the Muslim empire of the Caliphate. Iqta has been defined in Nizam-al-Mulk's Siyasatnama. Administrators of an Iqta were known as muqti or wali. They collected land revenue and looked after general administration. Muqtis (مقطع, "holder of an iqtaʿ") had no right to interfere with the personal life of a paying person if the person stayed on the muqtiʿ's land. They were expected to send the collected revenue (after deducting collection and administration charges) to the central treasury. Such an amount to be sent was called Fawazil. Theoretically, iqtas were not hereditary by law and had to be confirmed by a higher authority like a sultan or king. However, it was made hereditary in Islamic India by Firoz Tughlaq.

Individual iqtaʿ holders in Middle Eastern societies had little incentive to provide public goods to the localities assigned to them. The overarching theme was state power where the iqtaʿ was revocable and uninheritable. Though not an investment in a particular holding of land, the iqtaʿ, as a fiscal device, gave soldiers a vested interest in the regime.

Iqtadar (person holding iqta) and the Sultan had a mutually dependent relationship. There could be three types of Iqtadars. First, those who were appointed by the Sultan in fully conquered territories. Second, those who were appointed in partially conquered territories. These Iqtadars had to win the territories again, and hence the Sultan's control over them was relatively weaker. The third kind of Iqtadars were virtually independent, as they were appointed in unconquered territories.

== History ==
According to Shafiite scholars such as Al-Mawardi writing in his book Al-Ahkam al-Sultania w'al-Wilayat al-Diniyya, the earliest practice of iqta was rooted in the tradition of the Companions of the Prophet, such as when Muhammad gave Iqta' (taxable land) plot for Zubayr who later design the land for his own horse training. 20th century Shafiite scholar, Wahbah al-Zuhayli, also highlighted that az-Zubayr ownership were legal per ruling of Shafii. Thus, from the view of Shafiite scholars, an unclaimed land property could be freely given by Islamic government to particular individual whom they saw can cultivate and process the land plot so it can became productive land.

=== The Buyids reform ===
The Buyids codified the already existent system of tax farming. They united the Amirs of Persia and reorganized their land into Iqtas, whose borders remained largely similar to the predecessor states. Contrary to most other forms of Iqta, it was hereditary, but the land was divided when there were more sons of age.

=== Seljuk era ===
In the Seljuk Empire, the move toward the iqta' system was facilitated by the Persian bureaucrat Nizam al-Mulk "who developed and systemized the trend towards feudalism that was already inherent in the tax-farming practices of the immediately preceding period," It is made clear that muqtis hold no claim on the peasants/subjects other than that of collecting from them in a proper manner the due land tax that has been assigned to them. When the revenue has been realized from them, those subjects should remain secure from any demands of the muqtis in respect of their persons, wealth, families, lands and goods. The muqtis can't hold any further claims on them. The subjects can go to the King and address their grievances in case they are being subjugated by the muqtis. It is thus clear that the muqtis only hold the land under the king, the land in truth belongs to the Sultan. Nizam al-Mulk emphasizes an important element in the iqta- muqti's right to collect and appropriate taxes. Of course, the muqtis also had certain obligations to the Sultan. They had to maintain the troops and furnish them at call. The revenues they got from the iqtas were meant to be resources for him to do the same. The revenue was meant for the muqti's own expenses, payment and maintenance of the troops and the rest had to be sent back to the king. The muqti was thus a tax collector and army paymaster rolled into one.

=== Mamluk sultanate of Delhi ===
During the rule of Mamluk dynasty in India, Shamsa ud-din Iltutmish established the "Iqta' system" based on Mohammad Gori's ideas. It was very close to the original form of Iqta' as its main function was only to collect taxes by Muqtis/Iqtedars in India. They had no other right to the subjects apart from the taxes as long as taxes were paid. The money was used to pay for the landowner's army, which could be called by the Sultan at any time, making up for a relatively quick mobilisation and highly professional soldiers. A small part of the money was to be given to the Sultan, but the percentage was usually insignificant compared to the other expenses. Iqtas were given for exceptional military service or loyalty and were, unlike the original, usually hereditary.

The Iqta' system was later reorganized by Balban, who divided his empire into small pieces of land and opposed making Iqta hereditary. His absolutist rule concentrated on limiting the power of the estates (mainly the nobility and merchants) and securing his supreme authority as the king. He also dissolved the Council of Forty - Chahalgani, a form of sharing power between the highest nobles and the king. His rule was supported by the strengthened espionage and counter-espionage system and his personal secret police, called barids.

Muhammad Bin Tughlaq separated the roles of revenue collection and administration. He appointed another officer called amir to look after the administration. He started paying the soldiers from the central treasury to check corruption.

The Iqta' system was revived by Firuz Shah Tughlaq of the Tughlaq dynasty, who began assigning villages to soldiers instead of their salaries and also made the assignments hereditary to please the nobles.

Alauddin Khalji stressed on the transfer of Iqtadars in order to check their personal interests. He increased the role of bureaucracy in iqtas. Moreover, he appointed Diwan-i-bajarat to estimate the definite incomes of each iqta.

== Modern analysis ==
Orientalist Claude Cahen described the iqtaʿ as follows:

a form of administrative grant, often (wrongly) translated by the European word "fief". The nature of the iḳṭā' varied according to time and place, and a translation borrowed from other systems of institutions and conceptions has served only too often to mislead Western historians, and following them, even those of the East.

and Irfan Habib explained the Iqta concept as follows:

A mechanism had to be devised to collect the surplus from the peasantry and redistribute it among the members of the ruling class. The crucial element in this mechanism was the iqtaʿ that combined the two functions of collection and distribution without immediately endangering the unity of the political structure. The iqtaʿ was the territorial assignment and its holder was designated muqtiʿ.

== See also ==
- Tax farming
- Pronoia
- Kharaj
- Jizya
- Subah

== Appendix ==
=== Bibliography ===
- Cahen, Claude (1971). "Iḳṭāʿ". In Lewis, B.; Ménage, V. L.; Pellat, Ch. & Schacht, J. (eds.). The Encyclopaedia of Islam, Second Edition. Volume III: H–Iram. Leiden: E. J. Brill. pp. 1088–1091. OCLC 495469525.
- Cahen, Claude, “L’évolution de l’iqṭāʿ du IXe au XIIIe siežcle,” Annales, économies-sociétés-civilisation Vol. 8, (1953), pp. 25–52.
- Duri, A. A., “The Origins of the Iqṭāʿ in Islam,” al-Abḥāṯ Vol. 22 (1969), pp. 3–22.
- Küpeli, Ismail: iqta als "islamischer Feudalismus"? Munich, 2007, ISBN 978-3-638-74966-4
- Al-Zuhayili, Wahbah (2021). Fiqih Islam wa Adilatuhu Jilid 6 Jaminan (al-Kafaalah); Pengalihan Utang (al-Hawaalah); Gadai (ar-Rahn); Paksaan (al-Ikraah); Kepemilikan (al-Milkiyah) (in Indonesian). Gema Insani. p. 527. ISBN 9786022508892.
- Mujahidin, Mujahidin (2017). "Konsep Iqtha' Pemberian Tanah Kepada Masyarakat Dalam Pemikiran Ekonomi Al-Mawardi (Studi Kitab Al-Ahkam Alsultaniyyah)" [Iqtha Concept of Giving Land to the Communityh in Economic Thinking of Al-Mawardi (Study of the Kitab Al-Ahkam Alsultaniyyah)]. Al Amwal Journal of Islamic Economic Law. 2 (1): 1–17. doi:10.24256/alw.v2i1.535.
