= Bashnawiyya =

Medieval Kurdish tribe

Bashnawiyya (Standard Arabic: البشنوية; Kurdish: بەژنەوی) were a medieval Kurdish tribe inhabiting the region of Al-Jazira in Upper Mesopotamia, particularly around Jazirat Ibn Umar, Bohtan, and the fortress of Fanak. They are first attested in the late 10th century as allies of the Marwanid dynasty, and they remained an important Kurdish tribal group until the 13th century.

== Etymology and Origins ==
According to the Sharafnama, the tribe derived its name from an ancestor named Bajno (or Bazhnu), who settled at Fanak after separating from the rulers of Bohtan. Another Kurdish tradition traces the tribe to one of the legendary ancestral branches of the Kurds. Boris James notes that the Kurdish pronunciation was likely "Bejnawî", while Muslim historians Arabized the name as "al-Bashnawiyya".

== History ==
The Bashnawiyya first appear in historical sources during the rise of the Kurdish leader Badh ibn Dustak, founder of the Marwanid dynasty. They became his allies in 373 AH (983 AD) and supported his unsuccessful campaign against Mosul.

Following Badh's death, the alliance continued under the Marwanid rulers. Marriages took place between Bashnawiyya chiefs and Marwanid princesses, while Bashnawiyya contingents remained closely associated with the dynasty. Vladimir Minorsky notes that the Bashnawiyya of Fanak later assisted the Marwanid ruler Sulayman ibn Nasr al-Dawla in capturing Qal'at Mansur.

The Bashnawiyya established their principal stronghold at Fanak, which became one of the most important Kurdish fortresses in Upper Mesopotamia.

During the Zengid period, the tribe resisted Imad al-Din Zengi. In 541 AH (1146 AD), Zengi besieged Fanak, but failed to capture it before his assassination ended the campaign. Boris James identifies this as one of the tribe's most significant military achievements.

Unlike the Humaydiyya and Hakkariyya, the Bashnawiyya played little role in the expansion of the Ayyubid dynasty. Although a mosque named Masjid al-Bashnawiyyin existed in Aleppo, suggesting a Bashnawiyya presence in Syria, the tribe remained concentrated in Bohtan and the Zuzan highlands.

The Bashnawiyya disappear from historical records by the middle of the 13th century. He suggests they may have declined following the Kurdish–Turkoman conflicts of 581 AH (1186 AD), or that they were gradually assimilated into neighbouring Kurdish tribes, particularly the Humaydiyya.

== Territory ==
The Bashnawiyya inhabited northern Upper Mesopotamia, principally around Fanak, Jazirat Ibn Umar, Bohtan, Bashiri, the Zuzan highlands, and the upper Tigris valley.

== Society ==
Medieval historians describe the Bashnawiyya as renowned for their tribal solidarity (Assabiyya), courage, generosity, hospitality, and protection of refugees.

Ibn al-Athir describes them as the ansar ("supporters") of Badh al-Kurdi and praises their loyalty despite their relatively small numbers.

Boris James argues that the Bashnawiyya illustrate the widespread Kurdish practice of forming tribal alliances to establish and maintain dynastic power.

== Emirate ==
Later Kurdish historical tradition attributes to the Bashnawiyya a small Kurdish principality centred on Fanak. Traditional lists of its rulers include: Abu Tahir al-Bashnawi, Abd Allah ibn Abi Tahir, Fakhr al-Din Muhammad ibn Dawud ibn Mihran, Nasir al-Din Abu Nasr Mihran ibn Dawud, and Ibrahim.

== Notable members ==
- al-Husayn al-Bashnawi – poet of the Marwanid court.
- Muhammad al-Bashnawi – scholar.
- Abu Abd Allah al-Husayn ibn Dawud al-Bashnawi – scholar and author.
- Abu Bakr Muhammad ibn al-Husayn al-Bashnawi – hadith scholar.

== Legacy ==
The Bashnawiyya were amongst the principal Kurdish tribal groups of medieval Upper Mesopotamia. Their alliance with the Marwanids demonstrates the importance of tribal confederations in the rise of Kurdish dynasties. Although they disappear from historical records after the 13th century, they remain well documented in medieval Arabic chronicles and modern scholarship, particularly in the works of Vladimir Minorsky and Boris James.

== Sources ==
- James, Boris (2006). Saladin et les Kurdes: Perception d'un Groupe au Temps des Croisades (in French). Paris: Editions L'Harmattan. ISBN 978-2296001053.
