= Qaymariyya (tribe) =

13th century Kurdish tribe

The Qaymariyya (or Ḳaymariyya) also known as Qaymar, Qaymur, or Banu Qaymar, were a Kurdish tribe that formed an important military unit under the late Ayyubids and early Mamluks between the 1240s and 1260s. They played a secondary role in the Khwarazmian invasion of Palestine in 1244 and a leading role in the pro-Ayyubid coup d'état in Damascus in 1250.

== Origins ==
The Qaymariyya took their name from the fortress of Qaymur, from Zuzan al-Akrad region, located between Mosul and Akhlat. They have been described as a "minor faction", a "kingship group" and a "clan". Their leading emirs were related to one another.

In Upper Mesopotamia, the Qaymariyya first entered the service of the Ayyubid rulers al-Ashraf ibn al-Adil (died 1237) and al-Salih Ayyub ibn al-Kamil, who later settled some of them in Syria and Egypt. The emir Husam al-Din al-Hasan ibn Abi l-Fawaris married a daughter of al-Ashraf. In 1239, the leader of the Qaymariyya was Nasir al-Din Abi al-Ma'ali al-Husayni al-Qaymari, who acted as viceregent in Damascus during al-Salih Ayyub's campaign against Mujahid Shirkuh of Homs in March that year. In 1241 or 1242, Husam al-Din received Raqqa as an iqta' from al-Nasir Yusuf, the ruler of Aleppo. In Aleppo, he founded a madrasa that bore the name of the Qaymariyya. The emir Sayf al-Din ibn Yusuf ibn Abi l-Fawaris had been an advisor to Kayqubad I, the Seljuk sultan of Rum, before joining al-Ashraf. He then served Badr al-Din Lu'lu' of Mosul before joining al-Salih Ayyub in Egypt.

The Qaymariyya were first settled in Hama in 1243 or 1244. Although Kurdish tribes had been dominant in the Ayyubid army since the time of Saladin, their composition shifted over time. Under Saladin, the tribes of Hakkariyya, Humaydiyya, Zarazariyya and Mihraniyya were dominanta, but the Qaymariyya became dominant in al-Salih Ayyub's time. After al-Salih Ayyub became sultan of Egypt, he began purchasing Turk mamluks, diminishing the influence of the Kurds in the army.

== 1244 invasion of Palestine ==
Early in the summer of 1244, the Qaymariyya, allied with the Khwarazmiyya, invaded Palestine in alliance with al-Salih Ayyub against his Ayyubid relations and their Crusader allies. According to Muhammad ibn Ibrahim al-Khazraji:

In 642 [AH (1244–45 AD)], al-Malik al-Salih Najm al-Din Ayyub sent amir Jamal al-Din Aqush and amir Jamal al-Din Yahya to give gowns, cash and clothing to the amirs and khans of both al-Qaymariya and al-Khwarizmiya. Further, he granted al-Khalil and its surroundings to amir Najm al-Din and Ghazza to amir Nasir al-Din. The other amirs and the cavalry of al-halqa were granted villages as iqta's, and the Khwarizmiya were given the entire province of Damascus with the exception of Nablus.

The combined army numbered about 10,000 cavalry. They sacked Jerusalem and massacred its Christian inhabitants. The joined with an Egyptian army near Gaza and defeated a combined Syrian and Crusader force at the battle of La Forbie in October.

== 1250 Damascene coup d'état ==
The Qaymariyya resented the rise of the Turk mamluks in the Ayyubid army. Nevertheless, the two Qaymari leaders in Cairo—Sayf al-Din and 'Izz al-Din al-Qaymari—supported the mamluk-led coup d'état against Sultan al-Muazzam Turanshah on 2 May 1250. They refused, however, to take the oath to the mamluk sultan, Aybak.

The Turk commander of Damascus, Jamal al-Din ibn Yaghmur, did not recognize Aybak, but neither did he proclaim himself or any legitimate Ayyubid as sultan, leaving a power vacuum Damascus. The Qaymari emirs of Damascus, Nasir al-Din al-Qaymari and Diya' al-Din al-Qaymari, wrote to al-Nasir Yusuf inviting him to take Damascus and requesting enlarged iqta's in return for their support. Jamal al-Din placed attempted to maintain the loyalty of the Qaymariyya by placing each gate under the joint command of a Kurd and a Turk to ensure the loyalty of the former. The Qaymariyya, however, managed to seize control of the Bab al-Saghir and the Bab Jabiya gates. When al-Nasir Yusuf and the Aleppan army arrived before Damascus on 9 July 1250, Nasir al-Din opened the Bab al-Saghir to them. The garrison in the citadel soon surrendered.

In the aftermath of al-Nasir's entry, some Kurds pillaged the Turks' homes, even ripping earrings from their women's ears, according to al-Khazraji, "tarnishing the Kurds' reputation". After restoring order, al-Nasir exiled some of the Qaymariyya responsible. The Turk leaders, including Jamal al-Din, were imprisoned and their iqta's given to the Qaymariyya. In the entire affair, nobody was killed. When news of the coup in Damascus reached Cairo, Sayf al-Din and 'Izz al-Din were arrested. They were released within a few months.

== al-Nasir Yusuf's service ==
The Qaymariyya became the "pillar" of al-Nasir Yusuf's army. Of the five named units of his army, only the Qaymariyya never rebelled. In 1252, the iqta' of Nasir al-Din al-Qaymari supplied 250 horsemen. This is the largest iqta' known from Ayyubid Syria.

In 1251, al-Nasir Yusuf invaded Egypt. The battle of Kura' appeared at first to go his way before turning into a defeat. The Qaymari emir Diya' al-Din was captured and beheaded along with the commander-in-chief, Shams al-Din Lu'lu' al-Amini. Upon being mistakenly informed that the Ayyubids had scored a victory at Kura', Sayf al-Din urged that the khutba be pronounced in Cairo in the name of al-Nasir Yusuf. As a result, he was arrested. He was very nearly executed, but Aybak chose instead to exile him to Syria. He built a hospital in Damascus and a mausoleum in al-Salihiyya, where he was buried in 1256.

In 1258, one of the Qaymari emirs joined the army of Baybars, a mamluk from Egypt who had defected to al-Nasir Yusuf. Around the same time, the Kurdish Shahrazuriyya began fleeing to al-Nasir Yusuf's territory in the face of Mongol invasions. The Qaymariyya encouraged him to recruit the Shahrazuriyya, who had a fighting strength of 3,000 cavalry and would greatly increase the influence of Kurds over Turks in the military. The Shahrazuriyya proved rebellious and when al-Nasir Yusuf appointed the Qaymari emir Badr al-Din Huri al-Hadari to bring them into submission, the latter instead joined them.

A failed coup against al-Nasir Yusuf in 1260 would also have removed the Qaymari emirs from their positions of influenced.

== Under the Mamluks ==
After the fall of Aleppo to the Mongols, the Qaymariyya sent their women for refuge to Egypt. The men remained behind with al-Nasir Yusuf for fear of Turk retribution. The Mamluk sultan Qutuz, however, forced the women to give up their valuables.

The Qaymari emir Shihab al-Din was one of the escorts of al-Nasir Yusuf, who refused to seek protection from Qutuz. Following the Mamluk victory over the Mongols at the battle of Ayn Jalut, Qutuz treated the Qaymariyya with contempt. He confiscated their iqta's. As a result, the Qaymariyya showed more loyalty to Qutuz's replacement, Baybars. In 1263, Nasir al-Din, the leading Qaymari emir, was appointed governor of the al-futuhat (new territories) on the Palestinian coast by Baybars. He died in 1266 or 1267.

== Bibliography ==
- Amitai-Preiss, Reuven (1997). "The Mamluk Officer Class During the Reign of Sultan Baybars". In Ya'acov Lev (ed.). War and Society in the Eastern Mediterranean, 7th–15th Centuries. E. J. Brill. pp. 267–300.
- Eddé, Anne-Marie (1997). "Kurdes et Turcs dans l'armee ayyoubide de Syrie du Nord". In Ya'acov Lev (ed.). War and Society in the Eastern Mediterranean, 7th–15th Centuries. E. J. Brill. pp. 225–236.
- Humphreys, R. Stephen (1977). From Saladin to the Mongols: The Ayyubids of Damascus, 1193–1260. State University of New York Press.
- Satō, Tsugitaka (1986). "Iqṭāʿ Policy of Sultan Baybars I". Orient. 22: 85–104. doi:10.5356/orient1960.22.85.
- Satō, Tsugitaka (1997). State and Rural Society in Medieval Islam: Sultans, Muqtaʿs and Fallahun. E. J. Brill.
- Thorau, Peter (1992). The Lion of Egypt: Sultan Baybars I and the Near East in the Thirteenth Century. Longman.
