= Hadhabani =

Medieval Sunni Muslim Kurdish tribe and Emirate

Hadhabani or Hadhbāni, Hadhbānī, Hadhbāniyya, Heciban (Arabic: الهذبانية al-Hadhbāniyya; Kurdish: هەزەبانی، هۆزەبان، هۆزەوان, Hozabān, Hozwān), was a medieval Kurdish tribal confederation originating in the region of Mosul and Erbil, with territory ranging from Azerbaijan to Mosul. Associated with several dynasties including the Rawwadids, Shaddadids and Ayyubids, the confederation comprised multiple tribes, among them the Rawadiyya, Hakamiyya and Banu Maran.

== Etymology ==
According to Vladimir Minorsky, The name of the Tribe is derived from geographical term for the region of Irbil, which is preserved in the name of the Nestorian diocese, Adiabene (HaSayyap). however this is rejected by modern scholars, according to Vanly and Zeki, the tribe got their name from Khezan-Hezan. Their name in Kurdish was pronounced Hezan. Other scholors suggest that Khezan-Hezan gets its name from the tribe, not the other way around. The name is most likely a combination of Hoz (Kurdish: هۆز, Hoz; lit. 'Tribe') and Bān or Wān (Kurdish: بان، وان, Bān, Wān; lit. 'Chief, leader'), which means "Tribal leader".

== Territory ==
According to Ibn Hawqal the region of Jazira was the summer pasture of Hadhabani Kurds and winter pasture of Shaybani Arab tribe, The presence of Hadhabani in the 10th century is attested from Dvîn in Armenia, passing through the banks of the Caspian to Al-Jazirah.

== History ==
In 906 AD, Muhammad ibn Bilal Al-hadhbani, laid waste to the Mosul countryside. the Hamdanid ruler, Abu'l-Hayja Abdallah ibn Hamdan, pursued him but suffered a defeat. The Abbasid caliph of Baghdad sent reinforcements and Abu'l-Hayja continued pursuing Muhammad ibn Bilal along with 5,000 Hadhbani Kurdish families. A peace was made and the Muhammad ibn Bilal had to surrender all their territories in northern Mosul to Daseni and Humaydi Tribe.

By the early 10th century, the Hadhbaniyya occupied a territory extending from southern Azerbaijan to the Jazira, with a presence in Irbil, Shahrazur, Maragha, and Oshnavieh. Maragha served as a major stronghold of the tribe in Azerbaijan. During this period, the confederation began expanding northward into Azerbaijan, while still maintaining a presence in the Irbil and Shahrazur regions. Hadhbaniyya groups, particularly the Rawadiyya clan, entered the service of the Kurdish Shaddadid dynasty, which ruled from the 10th to the 12th centuries over a region stretching as far as Ani and Dvin in present-day Armenia. By the 1020s, Abu'l-Hayja ibn Rabib al-Dawla, who was the leader of the Hadhabani tribe, as well as the ruler of Urmia and the fortress of Barkari. Was at uneasy relations with his maternal uncle, Wasudan the ruler of Adharbayjan. In 1033/4, the Byzantine Empire captured the fortress at Wasudan's urging. The Abbasid caliph al-Qa'im (r. 1031–1075) convinced the Rawadids and the Hadhabanis to band together and recapture Barkari; they briefly reoccupied it until losing it permanently to the Byzantines. In 1037/38, a strong wave of Iraqiyya Ghuzz Turkic tribe led by the chiefs Buqa, Goktash, Mansur and Dana reached Azarbaijan. The Iraqiyya soon began to plunder the country, sacking the city of Maragha in 1039.

In 1041 AD, after the defeat of the invading Ghuz turks and subsequent massacre in Urmia by Rawadids and Hadhbani Kurds. They fled to Hakkari where they ravaged it. they were eventually defeated by the Kurds and 1500 Ghuz tribesmen were killed and the survivors were enslaved by the Kurds.

== Hadhabani branches ==
The Hadhbani tribe had multiple branches, these were the Hakamiyya that resided in Erbil and Shahrazur, The Rawadiyya that resided mainly in Adharbayjan, the Mihraniyya that were in Hakkari and Zawzān regions, and the Banu Maran in south of Mosul. The Mihranis or Mihraniyya, They made the infamous Kurdish corps Mihraniyya of the Ayyubid Army.

the Zarzari tribe, may have been a branch of Hadhabani tribe that inhabited ushnu and Rawanduz. while some Zarzaris resided in Sinjar.

Shaddadids, Ayyubids and probably Rawadids were descendant of one of the Hadhabani branches.

== Rulers ==
- Muhammad son of Bilal, around 906 came in conflicts with Abbasids, eventually retired to Azarbaijan.
- Jafar son of Shakkoya around 943, Salmas,
- Mir Abu Hija Musk son of Chako
- Abu Hidja son of Rabib al Dawla c. 1040 Urmia,
- Mir Sharraf al-Din Isa son of Musk c. 1045
- Mir Salar son of Musa c. 1046
- Mir Abul Hasan Ali son of Musk c. 1046–48
- Mir Abu Ali al al-Hasan son of Musk 1048–63
- Mir Abu Hija II, Husain son of Abi Ali Al-Hasan 1063-1080

== Notable people ==
- Husam ad-Din Abu'l-Hayja al-Samin, commander (Ispahsalar) of the Ayyubid Army

== See also ==
- Kurds
- List of Sunni Muslim dynasties
- List of Kurdish dynasties and countries
- Ayyubid Dynasty
- Hakkari tribe

== Sources ==
- Kennedy, Hugh (2016). The Prophet and the Age of the Caliphates. Routledge. ISBN 9781317376392.
- Öpengin, Ergin (2021). Bozarslan, Hamit; Gunes, Cengiz; Yadirgi, Veli (eds.). The Cambridge History of the Kurds. Cambridge University Press.
- James, Boris (2006). Saladin et les Kurdes: Perception d’un Groupe au Temps des Croisades (in French). Paris: Editions L'Harmattan. ISBN 978-2296001053.
- Madelung, Wilferd (1975). "Minor dynasties of northern Iran". In Frye, Richard N. (ed.). The Cambridge History of Iran: From the Arab Invasion to the Saljuqs. Vol. 4. Cambridge: Cambridge University Press. pp. 198–250. ISBN 0-521-20093-8.
