= Nasir al-Dawla (disambiguation) =

Nasir al-Dawla (Arabic: ناصر الدولة, lit. 'Defender of the Dynasty') was a Hamdanid emir of Aleppo in 935–967.

The same honorific title was also borne by:

- Badis ibn al-Mansur (d. 1016), Zirid emir of Ifriqiya in 996–1016
- Nasir al-Dawla ibn Hamdan (d. 1073), great-grandson of the Hamdanid emir and general in Fatimid service
- Nasr al-Dawla Ahmad ibn Marwan (1079–1085), a Marwanid ruler.
- Nasir-ud-Daulah (1794–1857), the Nizam of Hyderabad in 1829–1857
