= Muhammad ibn Bilal al-Hadhbani =

Kurdish tribal leader

Muhammad ibn Bilal
Names
- Muhammad ibn Bilal al-Hadhbani
- Dynasty: Hadhabani

Muhammad ibn Bilal al-Hadhbani, was the earliest recorded chief of the Hadhbani Kurds.

In 906 AD, he laid waste to the Mosul countryside. The Hamdanid ruler, Abu'l-Hayja Abdallah ibn Hamdan, pursued him but suffered a defeat. The Abbasid caliph of Baghdad sent reinforcement and Abu'l-Hayja continued his pursuit of Muhammad ibn Bilal along with 5,000 Hadhbani Kurdish families. A peace was made and the Muhammad ibn Bilal had to surrender all their territories in northern Mosul to the Daseni and Humaydi tribes.
