= Tarikh Mayyafariqin =

12th-century Arabic historical chronicle

Tarīkh Mayyāfāriqīn
- Author: Aḥmad b. Yūsuf b. 'Alī b. al-Azraq
- Language: Arabic
- Subject: History of Turcoman dynasties History of the caliphates
- Publication date: c. 1164/65, c. 1176/77
- English publication date: 1902

The Tarīkh Mayyāfāriqīn is an historical chronicle, written in Arabic, by Aḥmad b. Yūsuf b. 'Alī b. al-Azraq (c. 1116/1117- c. 1176/77). (Note: Hillenbrand states Ibn al-Azraq held numerous administrative posts. In 1147/48, he was purchasing copper for coins for Timurtash in al-Ma'dan. In 1148/49 and 1166/67, al-Azraq was mutawalli ishraf al-waqf(supervisor of charitably endowed property). By 1153/54, he had traveled to Georgia and was in the employ of King Demetrius I of Georgia.) The chronicle contains information pertaining to the Marwanids and the Artuqids, as they relate to the ancient city of Mayyāfāriqīn, which is now Silvan in present-day Turkey. The listing of Artuqid governors is, according to Hannah-Lena Hagemann, contentious, whereas the section on the Rashidun caliphs has received less academic attention. The contents of the Tarīkh Mayyāfāriqīn were used extensively by later biographers, geographers, and historians.

== Authorship ==
The chronicle is beset with several issues including that its title is uncertain, and very little is known about Ibn al-Azraq. He wrote two versions of this text, the first was written in 1164/65, while the second, an extended version of the first text was written in 1176/77.

There are two main difficulties: Firstly, the first folios are missing, which means the manuscript lacks both its title page and the author's name; and secondly, medieval sources that use the text usually mention its author only as Ibn al-Azraq. Most modern scholars follow the identification given by Ibn Shaddad, Ibn al-Adim, and Al-Sakhawi, who record his full name as Aḥmad b. Yūsuf b. 'Alī b. al-Azraq. Kahhāla and Ziriklī instead propose that the author was 'Abd Allāh b. Muḥammad b. 'Abd al-Wārith (Abū Faḍl) Ibn al-Azraq, and date his death to 590/1194. However, both claims seem to rest on the much later source by Ismā'īl Bāshā al-Baghdādī. In the absence of earlier evidence, there is little reason to abandon the identifications offered by Ibn Shaddad, al-Sakhawi, and Ibn al-‘Adīm.

== Contents ==
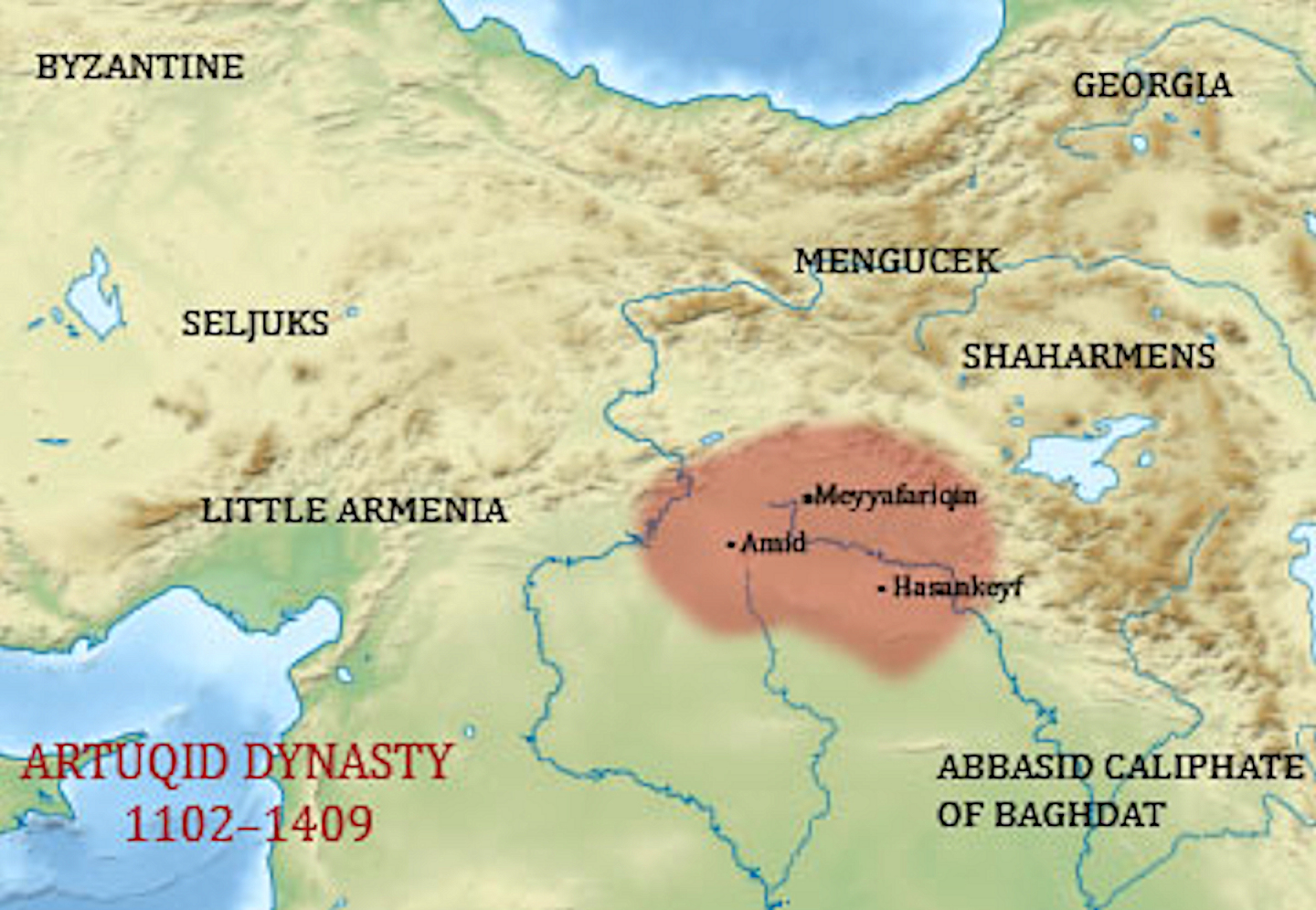
The Artuqid dynasty, which is mentioned in the Tarikh Mayyāfāriqīn

The Tarīkh Mayyāfāriqīn is especially significant for detailing the history of the city of Mayyāfāriqīn from the Hamdanid dynasty through to the Artuqids, and focuses on history during the period from c.1100-c.1150.

Included is a narrative of the city's pre-Islamic founding in the early fifth century, which the author claims came from a Syriac text preserved in a Syrian church in Mayyāfāriqīn and translated for him. In spite of being a chronicle surrounding the history of a city, the Tarīkh Mayyāfāriqīn expands on the wider course of regional history including the revival of caliphal influence, the expansion of the atabegates, and the emergence of lesser Turcoman dynasties that eroded Seljuq authority.

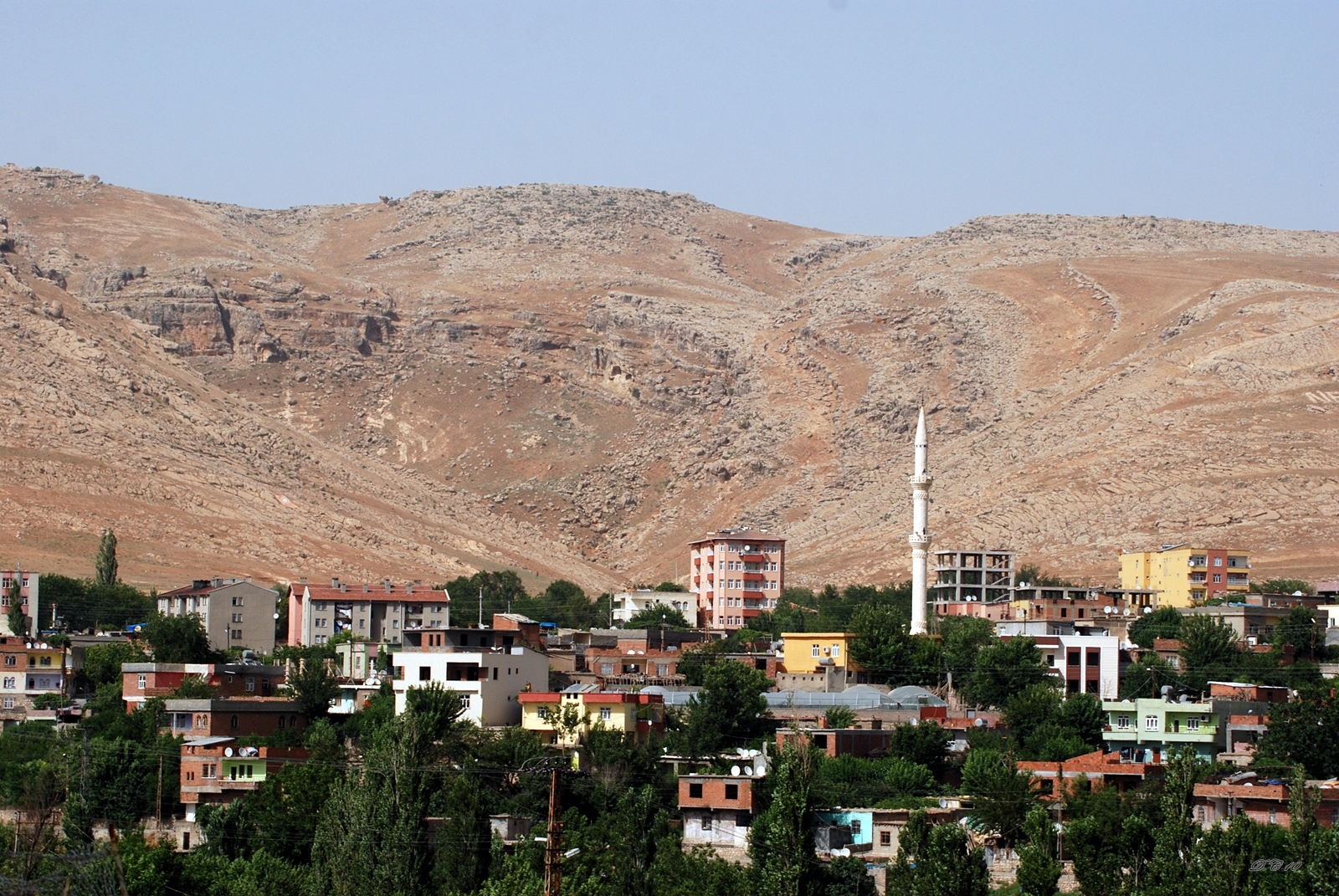
Modern Mayyāfāriqīn is now Silvan, in Diyarbakır Province in Turkey

The contents have the following listing:

- "1a-7a: Continuation of a conquest account already underway, starting with the conquest of Damascus in A.H. 14, carrying through the battle of Qadisiyya and al-Mada'in, and eventually focussing on the conquest of northern Mesopotamia under 'Iyad b. Ghanm in A.H. 18, the erection of the first mosque in Mayyafariqin, and the earliest administrative appointments.
- 7a—7b: Ibn al-Azraq's "statement of purpose".
- 7b-12b: Accounts of the foundation of Mayyafariqin and a survey of some of the town's pre-Islamic monuments, which draws heavily on a translated Syriac life of Maruta, and which is supplemented by other sources (both literary and epigraphic), and the author's commentary on the location, dating, and condition of these monuments in his day. It concludes with a brief historical survey of the town under Persian rule and its conquest.
- 12b—21b: Brief conquest material (restarting in A.H. 19), various death notices and accounts of 'Umar's life and death.26
- 21b-26b: The caliphate of'Uthman.
- 26b—43a: The caliphate of Ali; 'Ali's death on 34b, and his designation of al-Hasan at 11. 19–21
- 43a-44a: "Account (dhikr) of his ['Ali's] progeny and wives".
- 44a-44b: The caliphate of al-Hasan.
- 44b-50b: The reign of Mu'awiya.
- 50b-62b: "Account of the reign of Yazld b. Mu'awiya and the killing of al-Husayn".
- 62b-63a: The reign of Marwan b. al-Hakam.
- 63a-74a: The reign of Abd al-Malik.
- 74a-82b: The reigns of al-Walid I, Sulayman, 'Umar II, Yazid II, Hisham, Al-Walid II, Yazid III, Ibrahim, and Marwan II.
- 82b—84b: List of Umayyads and the lengths of their reigns, followed by anti-Umayyad polemics.
- 84b-85a: List of claimants to the caliphate during the Umayyad period.
- 85a-86a: The beginning of the 'Abbasid da'wa: their relations with 'Alids, the movement in Khurasan, family politics, and defeat of Marwan II.
- 86a-87b: List of the 'Abbasid caliphs, their age at death, and the length of their reigns, to al-Musta'sim.
- 87b-110a: The caliphate of successive Abbasids from al-Saffah to al-Radi.
- 110a: The beginning of Ḥamdānid rule"

== Use in later chronicles ==
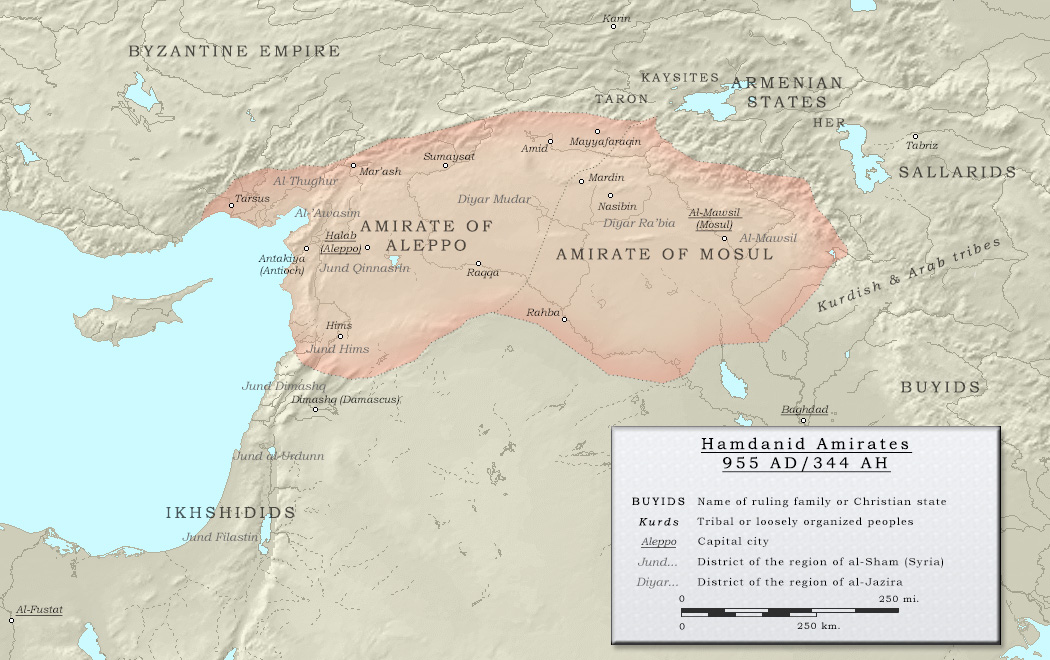
The Hamdanid dynasty which is mentioned in the Tarīkh Mayyāfāriqīn

=== Sibt ibn al-Jawzi ===
The Tarikh Mayyāfāriqīn has a poor literary quality and is filled with grammatical mistakes and informal expressions. Even so, later historians still used it, lifting substantial sections for their own works. In the Mirʾāt al-zamān, Sibt ibn al-Jawzi reproduces several passages that appear to originate from the Mayyāfāriqīn. Hillenbrand theorizes that al-Jawzi may have used a lost version of the Mayyāfāriqīn.

=== Ibn Khallikan ===
Hillenbrand claims that the Wafayat al-a'yan wa anba' abna al-zama, by Ibn Khallikan, uses the Mayyāfāriqīn in greater detail beyond what has been cited by academics. Khallikān's habit of rephrasing his sources rather than quoting them verbatim obscures which elements he borrowed from al-Azraq's chronicle. Nevertheless, Khallikān appreciated the significance of the Mayyāfāriqīn's original content while avoiding the distorted, unclear, or seriously erroneous reports.

=== Izz al-Din ibn Shaddad ===
Ibn Shaddād’s al-Aʿlāq al-Khaṭīra fī dhikr umarāʾ al-Shām wa’l-Jazīra draw heavily on the Mayyāfāriqīn, particularly for its material on the Jazīra. Ibn Shaddād refers to al-Azraq on only two occasions, yet Hillenbrand believes that his work still reflects substantial dependence on the Mayyāfāriqīn.

=== Ibn Wasil ===
Ibn Wāṣil's Mufarrij al-Kurūb fī akhbār Banī Ayyūb is key historical source for the Ayyūbids. Both Claude Cahen and Nikita Elisseeff fail to mention Ibn Wāṣil's usage of the Tarīkh Mayyāfāriqīn. Ibn Wāṣil's borrowing covers key historical issues, like the Seljuq sultans and their relationships with Abbasid caliphs in the 12th century. His wording of al-Mustarshid leaving Baghdad and his murder near Maragha are virtually identical to al-Azraq's writing. Ibn Wāṣil, also copies al-Azraq verbatim when he writes of Sultan Mas'ud's meeting with caliphate officials.

== Modern translations ==
In 1882, al-Azraq's chronicle was translated in Ferdinand Wüstenfeld's, Die Geschichtschreiber der Araber und ihre Werke, though it would be in 1902 that Henry Frederick Amedroz published the manuscript concentrating on the latter folio that covered the Marwanid dynasty. Both British Library manuscripts are incomplete, and it is especially relevant, though unfortunate, that BL OR 5803 lacks several folios at its beginning.

The historiography of Ibn al-Azraq's chronicle is based on his writing of the Marwanid and Artuqid dynasties. Scholars have tended to focus first on the Marwānids and Artuqids—chapters that receive much more attention than his early narrative of the pre-Ḥamdānid era. Ibn al-Azraq provides rich, localized detail on the Ḥamdānid, Marwānid, and especially Artuqid rulers, under whom he lived.

By contrast, al-Azraq's treatment of the Rāshidūn caliphs (starting with ʿUmar), and the Umayyad and Abbasid caliphates up to al-Rāḍī, has been far less studied. These sections are relatively wide-ranging and offer little specific information about Mayyāfāriqīn or the northern Jazīra; they more closely mirror the narrative style of general Islamic historical works. Nevertheless, Ibn al-Azraq includes valuable data not found in 10th century or earlier sources, the names of governors of Mayyāfāriqīn and Diyarbakır. Hannah-Lena Hagemann, professor of History of the Near East at the University of Hamburg, argues the administrative information written by al-Azraq is problematic.

== Sources ==
- Hagemann, Hannah-Lena (2023). "Limits of Empire: The Jazīran North before the Tenth Century". Journal of Late Antique, Islamic and Byzantine Studies. 2 (1–2): 12–58. doi:10.3366/jlaibs.2023.0014.
- Hillenbrand, Carole (1979). The History of the Jazīra 1100–1150: the contribution of Ibn Al-Azraq al-Fāriqī (PhD thesis). Vol. 1. University of Edinburgh. hdl:1842/7341.
- Hillenbrand, Carole (1990). A Muslim Principality in Crusader Times: The Early Artuqid State. Peeters Publishers. ISBN 978-9062580668.
- Robinson, Chase F. (1996). "Ibn al-Azraq, His Tarīkh Mayyāfāriqīn, and Early Islam". Journal of the Royal Asiatic Society. 3rd (1 (April)). Cambridge University Press: 7–27. doi:10.1017/S1356186300014747.
