= Hakkari (tribe) =

Medieval Kurdish tribe, military unit of the Ayyubid Army

Hakkari, Al-Hakkariyya, Hakkariyya or Hakkarians, were a large medieval Kurdish tribe and a royal house, that played a significant role in the Ayyubid dynasty and the Crusades.

== Name ==
The Hakkari were recorded in Islamic sources as al-Hakkārīyya (Arabic: الهکارية), while in Christian Syriac sources they were recorded as Hakkarāyē (ܗܲܟܵܖ̈ܵܝܹܐ , "Hakkarians").

== Region ==
The Hakkari tribe resided in the eastern part of Zozān region, in the district of Jabal al-Hakkariyya, located between modern day northeast Mosul highlands and the foothills of western Adharbayjān, near the Gulmarkiyya tribe. Their domain included Asheb or Asep, Tushi or Tusi, Judaydla catles, Suri, Harur, Malasi, Babukha, Bakza and Jabal Luhayja, to the north of Mosul (in the direction of Nisibis). Ashib was their capital.

== History ==
=== Early record ===
The tribe lived a nomadic lifestyle in the early 10th century. In 979, The Hakkari tribe moved further westward crossing the Great Zab river, and taking over the Beth Daseni, an old Nestorian diocese. They then began massacring the local Christian population. According to 10th century Syriac writer, Joseph Busnaya, over 5,000 Christians were massacred by the Hakkari Kurds.

In 980AD, the Buyid ruler, Fanna Khusraw sent an expedition against the Hakkari tribe, probably as punishment as a response to their mass murder of Christians in Dasen. The Hakkari chief was besieged by the Buyid army, the Buyids promised the Hakkari chief that if he surrendered he would be spared. However when the Hakkari chief surrendered, he was crucified and his body was put on display on the road to Mosul.

The Hakkariyya tribe submitted to Badh ibn Dustak and were incorporated into the Marwanid realm.

=== Turkic incursions ===
In 1041AD, after the defeat of the invading Oghuz Turks and the subsequent massacre of them in Urmia by the Rawadids, they fled to Hakkari where they ravaged it. While they were involved in the mountains, the Hakkari Kurdish tribesmen attacked them, killed 1500 Oghuz men, took many captives and much booty.

Jayush Bag (the Arabic rendition of Chavush Beg), the Seljuk Governor of Mosul, in 1115-1116, led an expedition against the Hakkari Kurds as a consequence of Hakkari banditry on the roads leading to Mosul.

=== Zengid era ===
In 1133, the Hakkari chief, Abu'l-Hayja Al-Hakkari, went to Mosul and pledged his allegiance to Imad ad-Din Zenki. According to some sources, he never went back to reign over his land and stayed in Mosul, leaving his son Ahmad and his deputy Baw al-Arji to rule over his domain. He died in Mosul in 1142. In the summer of 1142, Imad al-Din Zengi marched with a large force towards the Hakkari capital, Ashib. He captured the castle of Julab and killed the Usurper of the Hakkari throne, Al-Arji. Imad ad-Din Zengi demolished the Julab castle and rebuilt another one carrying his name, Al-'imaddiyya.

== Hakkariyya regiment and Ayyubid era ==
Hakkariyya regiment
- الهکارية
- Active: 1143-1300?
- Allegiance: Zengid dynasty (1142-1169); Ayyubid Sultanate (1171-1260); Mamluk Sultanate (1260-1300?)
- Type: Cavalry
- Size: 4,000-6,000

Commanders
- Commander: Emir al-Akrād; Muqaddam al-Akrād; Amir al-Kabir; Ispahsalar; Emir Al-Hakkariyya
- Notable commanders: Sayf ad-Din Mashtub

after Imad al-Din Zengi’s campaign into Hakkari territory, the Hakkari tribesmen enlisted in the Zengid army as mercenaries, numbering over 4,000-6,000. They established the Hakkariyya regiment which was led by Sayf ad-Din Mashtub (son of Ahmad and grandson of Abu'l-Hayja Al-Hakkari) and Isa Al-Hakkari. The Hakkariyya regiment were the main reason for Saladin's succession in Egypt and the establishment of the Ayyubid Sultanate. The Hakkariyya along with the Hadhbaniyya, were the largest and most powerful Kurdish tribes that made up the Military oligarchy within the Ayyubid Sultanate. Emir Mand, one of the Hakkari Emirs was granted the emirate of Kilis. In 1185, Sayf ad-Din Mashtub the commander-in-chief of the Hakkariyya regiment, Took part in Saladin's expedition against the Zengid Emirate of Mosul. Sayf ad-Din Mashtub was assigned by Saladin to take over Jazirat ibn Omer. probably using him as a rallying point for his tribesmen, In fact many Hakkari Kurds gathered around him. but Saladin had to give up the campaign. During the siege of Acre, Sayf al-Din was actively engaged in supplying Ayyubid troops through Sidon. in the beginning of 1191, he was appointed to the post of commander of the garrison within the fortress besieged by the Crusaders. Acre was in its throes. Sayf al-Din went out to meet the French Crusader king but the latter insisted on an unconditional surrender, There began desertions from the fortress. Saladin could not break the ring of the siege and Acre fell on 12 July 1191. Sayf ad-Din Mashtub was captured and closely guarded, but he was able to escape. He appeared before Saladin on May 15 1192. Sayf ad-Din was granted the Fiefdom of Nablus, but died on 6 November 1192. After Saladin, the Hakkariyya regiment were under the service of Az-Zahir Ghazi and his successors. The Hakkariyya remained the dominant military oligarchy within the Ayyubid emirate of Aleppo, until they were eventually replaced by the Qaymariyya as the Dominant Kurdish tribal military oligarchs.

== Later years ==
in 1218, the Zengid ruler of Mosul, ‘Izz al-Din Mas'ud II, had seized ‘imaddiyyah and the remainder of the fortresses of the Hakkâri and Zawzān. According to Minorsky, “It must have been these events that caused the Hakkari to be driven back towards the lands at the sources of the Great Zab.” However, it would seem that they eventually did return. As al-Umari lists a number of Kurdish tribes that he knew about during his lifetime. Among them, he notes that the Hakkâri tribe lived at ‘imaddiyyah and numbered 4,000 men. On the other hand, the tribe of Julāmerk numbered 3,000 men of “Umayyad origin”.

== Legacy ==
The Hakkari Province, city along with Hakkari emirate, got their name from this tribe.

== Sources ==
- Humphreys, R. S. (1987). "Ayyubids". Encyclopaedia Iranica, Vol. III, Fasc. 2. pp. 164–167.
- Wilmshurst, David (2011). The Martyred Church: A History of the Church of the East. East and West Publishing.
- Humphreys, Stephen (1977), From Saladin to the Mongols: The Ayyubids of Damascus, 1193–1260, SUNY Press, ISBN 978-0-87395-263-7
- Minorsky, Vladimir (1953). Studies in Caucasian History. New York: Taylor’s Foreign Press. ISBN 0-521-05735-3.
