= Siege of Jerusalem (1244) =

Part of the Sixth Crusade

- Part of the Crusades
Date	July 15, 1244
Location	Jerusalem 31°47′00″N 35°13′00″E
Result	Ayyubid victory
Territorial changes	Muslim capture of Jerusalem

Belligerents
Ayyubid Sultanate	Kingdom of Jerusalem

Commanders and leaders
As-Salih Ayyub	Unknown

Units involved
Qaymar corps Khwarazmians mercenaries	

Strength
10,000	Unknown

Casualties and losses
Unknown	Unknown
- 6,000 Christian civilians massacred at the Tower of David, 300 escaped to Jaffa

The siege of Jerusalem of 1244 took place after the Sixth Crusade, when a Khwarazmian army associated with the Ayyubid sultan conquered the city on July 15, 1244.

== Prelude ==
Emperor Frederick II of the Holy Roman Empire led the Sixth Crusade from 1228 to 1229 and claimed the title of King of Jerusalem as the husband of Isabella II of Jerusalem, queen since 1212. The army brought by the emperor and his reputation in the Muslim world were enough to recover Jerusalem, Bethlehem, Nazareth and several strongholds without fighting, as signed by a treaty with the Ayyubid Sultan al-Kamil. However, Jerusalem did not remain in the hands of Christians for long, as, despite further territorial gains a few years earlier in the Barons' Crusade, the latter did not control the surroundings of the city sufficiently to be able to ensure an effective defense.

The Khwarazmian army consisted of 10,000 cavalry, comprising both some of the remnants of the predominantly Kipchak army of the last Khwarazmshah, Jalal al-Din Mangburni, and the Kurdish Qaymariyya. They were acting in concert with the Ayyubid sultan.

== Battle ==
In 1244, the Ayyubids allowed the Khwarazmians, whose empire had been destroyed by the Mongols in 1231, to attack the city. The siege took place on 15 July, and the city fell rapidly. The Khwarazmians plundered the Armenian Quarter, where they decimated the Christian population and drove out the Jews. In addition, they sacked the tombs of kings of Jerusalem in the Church of the Holy Sepulchre and dug out their bones, in which the tombs of Baldwin I and Godfrey of Bouillon became cenotaphs. On 23 August, the Tower of David surrendered to the Khwarazmian forces and some 6,000 Christian men, women, and children marched out of Jerusalem where they were massacred even after a promise of safe passage, only 300 would escape to Jaffa.

== Aftermath ==
The sack of the city and the massacre which accompanied it prompted the Crusaders to assemble a force to join the Ayyubid forces and fight against the Egyptian and Khwarazmian forces in the Battle of La Forbie. Moreover, the events encouraged the king of France Louis IX to organize the Seventh Crusade.

== Sources ==
- Humphreys, R. Stephen (1977). From Saladin to the Mongols: The Ayyubids of Damascus, 1193–1260. State University of New York Press.
- Satō, Tsugitaka (1986). "Iqṭāʿ Policy of Sultan Baybars I". Orient. 22: 85–104. doi:10.5356/orient1960.22.85.
