= Amir al-turkman =

Leader of Turkoman tribes in Mamluk Syria

Amir al-turkman (lit. 'emir of the Turkomans'), or muqaddam al-turkman (lit. 'commander of the Turkomans'), were military or administrative ranks in the Mamluk Sultanate aimed at controlling the Turkoman tribes inhabiting northern Syria.

In 1337, the title was conferred to Zayn al-Din Qaraja, founding Bey of Dulkadir (r. 1337–53), by al-Nasir Muhammad (r. 1293–94, 1299–1309).

The responsibilities of muqaddam al-turkman was to gather Turkoman tribes in times of "Holy War", ensure the obedience of these tribes, and to report to nearby governors or the sultan of the demise of a tribal leader who received "salaries or feudal fiefs" from the state so that their heirs could be identified. Historian David Ayalon stated he doesn't know if amir al-turkman referred to the same rank.

The position was reestablished in 1501 and was initially held by the inspector of the Mamluk army until 1516. After that date, the position was transferred to Turkoman nobility marching against the Ottoman state for the Mamluks during the reign of Al-Ashraf Qansuh al-Ghuri (r. 1501–16).

== See also ==
- Muqaddam al-Akrad
- Amir al-ʿarab

== Bibliography ==
- Ayalon, David (2016). Islam and the Abode of War: Military Slaves and Islamic Adversaries. Routledge. ISBN 978-0860784302.
- El-Azhari, Taef (2005). "The Turkmen Identity Crisis in the Fifteenth-Century Middle East: The Turkmen-Turkish Struggle for Supremacy". Chronica. 5: 97–107.
- Har-El, Shai (1995). Struggle for Domination in the Middle East: The Ottoman-Mamluk War, 1485-91. E.J. Brill. ISBN 9004101802. OCLC 624096003.
- Yinanç, Refet (1989). Dulkadir Beyliği (in Turkish). Ankara: Turkish Historical Society Press. ISBN 9751601711. OCLC 21676736.
