= Akre =

Akrê ئاکرێ (Sorani Kurdish) عقرة (Arabic)
- City
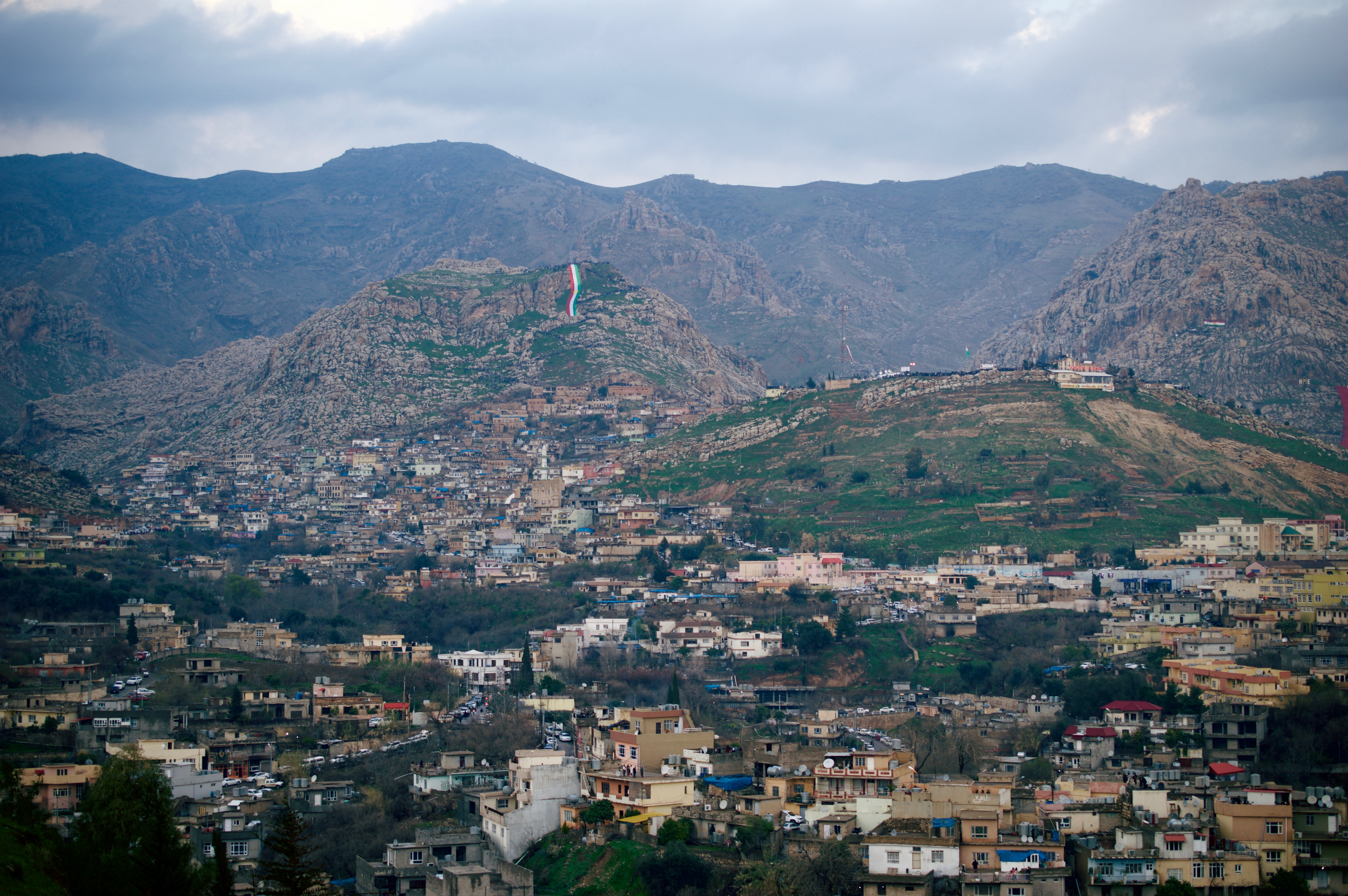
- Newroz festival in Akre

- Location of Akre
- Coordinates: 36°44′29″N 43°53′36″E
- Country: Iraq
- Autonomous Region: Kurdistan
- Province: Nineveh Governorate (de jure) Duhok Governorate (de facto)
- District: Akre District
- Established: 7th century BC

Government
  - Governor: Dalawar Bozo

Population (2018)
  - Total: 68,100
- Time zone: +3

Akre (Kurdish: ئاکرێ, romanized: Akrê, Arabic: عقرة, Syriac: ܥܩܪ, romanized: Aqra') is a city located in Kurdistan Region of Iraq. It is disputed by the Nineveh Governorate and the Duhok Governorate which both partially claim it. Akre is known for its celebrations of Newroz.

== History ==
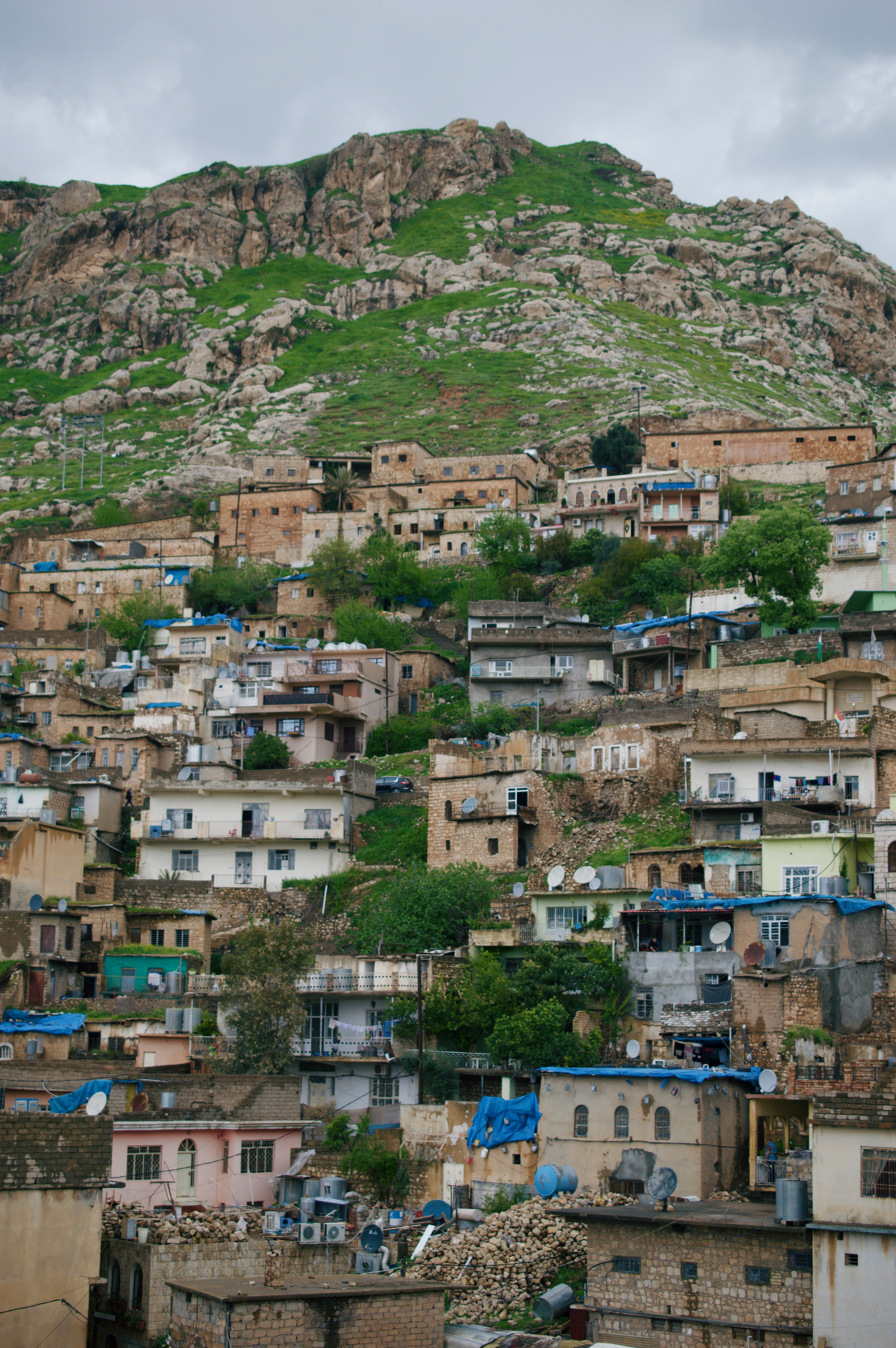
Buildings in Akre, on a steep slope with a mountain behind them

The city was built in the 7th century B.C. and is one of the oldest continuously inhabited cities in the world. The Medes ruled the city from 612 to 550 BC in what is known as its golden age. Zoroastrian Prince Zand was the prince of the city.

In year 115, the town came under Roman control commanded by Emperor Trajan and he set up a victory statue in the city. However, the locals quickly revolted and removed the statue.

The city was the fief of the Kurdish Humaydi tribe since the 10th century, and as such, Yaqut al-Hamawi indicated that it was also known as ‘Aqr al-Ḥumaydiya. In 1133, the city was invaded by Imad al-Din Zengi of the Zengid dynasty who destroyed the defense wall of the city. The 14th-century Shihab al-Umari also noted the presence of the Yazidi Dasni tribe. The decline of the Principality of Bitlis from the 1500s and 1700s allowed Bahdinan to take Akre and its surroundings. Bahdinan would however lose the town to Emir Muhammad Kor of the Soran Emirate in 1833. Before losing the city, the Bahdinan era of the city saw significant cultural and economic developments and constructions. The city wall was also rebuilt with alabaster. However, during the 18th century, the city fell victim to various military campaigns from Soran Emirate which ultimately captured the city in 1833. The city would be captured by the Ottomans in 1842 due to its strategic location and continued to be under Ottoman rule until 1918. During this period, it was administered as part of the Mosul Vilayet and was populated by Christians, Jews, and Muslims.

=== 20th century ===
In 1924, 90.4% of the population was Kurdish, while that number decreased to 64.7% in 1931. In 1947, 90% of the population was Kurdish.

== Notable natives ==
- Dr. Widad Akreyi, award-winning international humanitarian, medical expert, author
- Hiner Saleem, Kurdish film director
- Sherwan Sherwani, Kurdish Journalist
- Yitzhak Mordechai, former Israeli General & Minister of Defense
- Hoshyar Zebari, former Iraqi Foreign minister
- Sarkaft Hesso Akreyi ( 1991 - ) Vertegenwoordiger - Barzani Volunteer Group NL/KRD

== Bibliography ==
- Eppel, Michael (2018), "The Kurdish emirates", Routledge Handbook on the Kurds, Routledge Handbooks Online, pp. 35–47, doi:10.4324/9781315627427-4, ISBN 978-1-138-64664-3, S2CID 186808301
- Ismail, Shireen Y. (2015), Promoting integrated heritage conservation and management in Iraqi Kurdistan Region applicability of values-based approach the case study of Akre and Amedy City in Duhok Province., University of Dortmund
