= Humaydi (tribe) =

Medieval Kurdish tribe, military unit of the Ayyubid Army

Humaydi or Humaydiyya (Kurdish: Hevêdî), was a medieval Kurdish tribe branch of Çehârbuhtî Kurdish tribal federation. That inhabited the regions of Al-Jazira and Zozān.

== History ==
=== Early history ===
The Humaydi Tribe is first mentioned by 9th-century Arab geographer Ibn Hawqal. He mentions that the Humaydi Tribe along with Hadhbaniyya and Lariyya Kurdish tribes, had their winter pasture in Jazira region. The Humaydi Tribe along with Hadhbani and Daseni, revolted against the Hamdanid rule in 906.

Badh Dustak, the founder of Marwanid Emirate, was the chief of Humaydi Tribe.

=== Marwanid Emirate ===
Badh Dustak, the Humaydi Tribal chief. who inherited the domain from his father, Dustak Çehârbuhtî. Badh was a head of a war band. In 978, Badh began expanding his domain further north and west. He captured Mush, Khlat, Malazgart, Ercish, Bargiri and Taron from the Romans. During the Marwanid era, the Humaydi Tribe gained dominance among the western Kurdish tribes. Even after the fall of the Marwanid Emirate, the tribe persisted.

=== Humaydis of Akre ===
The exact time when the Humaydi Tribe became dominant over Akre is unknown, most likely in the early 10th century. Due to Humaydi Tribe dominating over Akre, the city was referred to as Aqr Al-Humaydiyya "Akre of the Humaydis".

The Humaydi principality of Akre was an ally of the Hadhbani principality of Irbil. In 1048, the Hadhbani and Humaydi Kurds fell out with Qirwash, the Uqaylid ruler Mosul. The ruler of 'Aqr was Abu'l-Hasan ibn Aysakan al-Humaydi and the ruler of Irbil was Abu'l-Hasan ibn Musak al-Hadhbani. The latter had a brother named Abu Ali ibn Musak whom Abu'l-Hasan Humaydi helped to take his brother’s domain. He did this while Qirwash was in Iraq. The latter on his return intervened in the affairs of the country and had al-Humaydi imprisoned. His intervention ended in failure and the same rulers remained in power in 'Aqr and Irbil.

=== Zengid era ===
When Imad ad-Din Zenki came to power, the Humaydi chief and ruler of Akre and shush castles, 'Isa al-Humaydi swore his Allegiance to Imad ad-Din Zenki. When the Abbasid caliph laid siege on Mosul in July 1133 for eighty days, Isa al-Humaydi defected to the Abbasid side. However the siege failed, and Imad ad-Din Zenki sent an expedition against the Humaydi Kurds as punishment. After a long fight, the Zengids were successful of subduing the Humaydis of Akre and surrounding regions.

== Humaydiyya Military contingent ==
The Humaydiyya military tribal contingent was less prominent to the other Kurdish tribal military elites within the Ayyubid Sultanate. They probably numbered around 1,000 troops. according to James, it's possible that the Humaydi Tribe only joined the Ayyubids during Saladin's campaign against Atabagates of Mosul in 1182. Al-Isfahani described the Humaydi contingent of the Ayyubid Army as:

The Humaydiyya [are] commendable experts in combat and war.

== Relationship with other Kurdish tribes ==
The Humaydi Tribe had a long relation with their Hadhbani and Bashnawiyya Kurdish neighbors, as both the Humaydi and Hadhbani associated themselves with the Ayyubids.

== Notable people ==
- Abu'l-Hasan Al-Humaydi, c.1048, ruler of Humaydi principality of Akre
- 'Isa Al-Humaydiyi, c.?-1134, ruler of Humaydi principality of Akre
- Badh Dustak, founder of Marwanid dynasty
- Nusayr Al-Humaydi (died 1190), commander of Humaydiyya contingent of Ayyubid army
- Muhammad Shihab ad-Din al-‘Aqri al-Adawi, a 12th century faqih, belonging to Adawiyya order

== See also ==
- Kurds
- Ayyubid Dynasty
- Hakkari tribe
- Hadhbani

== Sources ==
- James, Boris (2006). Saladin et les Kurdes: Perception d'un Groupe au Temps des Croisades (in French). Paris: Editions L'Harmattan. ISBN 978-2296001053.
