= Zuzan al-Akrad =

Medieval historical region

Zuzan al-Akrad Zozan, زۆزان
- Region

Ethnicities: Kurds and Armenians

Zawzan also known as Zuzan al-Akrad (Note: Zozān al-Akrād, Zawzan, Nahiyat al-Zuzan Bilad al-Zuzan Zozān, and Zawzan) was a historical mountainous area, it refers to a region cited in medieval Islamic sources that stretched from northeast of Jazira, all the way to north west of Azerbaijan.

== Name and usage ==
The name Zozān or Zuzan (Arabic: زوزان Zuzān, Zawzān) is derived from Kurdish (Zozan, زۆزان, Zozān ; lit. 'Summer pasture'), while al-Akrad (Arabic: الأکراد al-Akrād) is the Arabic word for "Kurds". It literally means "Zozan of the Kurds".

The region is also mentioned as Bilad Zuzan, Nahiyat al-Zuzan and Zuzan al-Akrad.

== Territory and location ==
As historical evidence, various historians and contemporary witnesses are used to locate Zuzan:

- according to Yaqut al-Hamawi: "Zuzan region is located in the center of the Armenian mountains between Akhlat, Azerbaijan, Diyar-Bakr and Mosul."
- According to Ibn al-Athir: "Zuzan is a vast region located on the eastern border of the Tigris river in the region of Jazirat Ibn ‘Umar. It starts at a distance covered in two days from Mosul, extend to the boundaries of Khilat and ends in Azerbaijan until the district of Salmas."

== Population ==
The Zuzan region was inhabited mainly by Christian Armenians in the early 10th century. While Kurds where located in the south and eastern Zuzan, in a region called Diyar al-Akrād "home of the Kurds". From 10th century onwards, more Kurdish Muslim tribes migrated to Zuzan and to the west. Changing the demographic and political makeup of the region. various independent Kurdish tribes and tribal confederations became the overall rulers of Zuzan. While the Christian Armenians were subjects of the Kurds.

=== Armenians ===
The Armenians who were Christians, made up the majority of Zawzan or Zuzan region, up until 13th century. according to 10th century historian ibn Hawqal, the master of most of Zuzan region was al-Dayrānī, probably Derenik-Ashot, the Armenian king of Vaspurakan between Lake Van and Mount Ararat.

=== Kurds ===
The Kurdish presence in Zuzan region is documented since 10th-century. Various Kurdish tribes ruled over Zuzan, holding various castles and fortresses. The Kurdish tribes that ruled and inhabited Zuzan were Al-Bukhiyya, al-Bashnawiyya, al-Hakkariyya, al-Humaydiyya, Al-Daseniyya, and al-Qaymariyya.
