= Zerzar =

Medieval Sunni Muslim Kurdish tribe and Military unit

Zerzari or Zerzarok, Zarzariyya, Zirzariyya (Kurdish: زێڕزار، زەرزاری، زێڕزارۆک, Zērzār, Zērzārok), was a Kurdish tribe during the Middle Ages. The Zarzariyya were most likely a branch of the Hadhbani tribe, they made a Military cavalry unit in the Ayyubid Sultanate.

== Name ==
The name of the Tribe is a combination of Zēr (Kurdish: زێڕ, Zēr; lit. 'Gold') and Zar or Zarok (Kurdish: زاڕۆک، زار, Zār, Zārok; lit. 'Child'), which means "Golden child".

== Territory ==
The Zarzārī tribe originally came from the Erbil region. Based on al-ʿUmarī’s (d. 1349) descriptions, they controlled a strategic mountainous area roughly bounded by the Dukan lake in the south, Šino/Ushnu in the north, the Qandil mountains in the east, and Rawanduz (Ḫuftiyān) in the west. Their tribal strongholds included Ḫuftiyān al-Zarzārī (Rawanduz), Ḫuftīḏkān/Rustāq al-Zāb (Qala Diza), and Sīdakān (?), forming a triangle that allowed them to dominate this key corridor between the Ilkhanid-controlled Azerbaijan and the Erbil plains leading to the Jazira steppe. Though geographically small, this “pocket” held crucial strategic importance, controlling a key pass between the Mongol-held Azerbaijan region and the plains of Erbil. From the mid-13th century, sources note the Zarzārī’s independence from major states, with neighboring groups such as the Balkān, who controlled the Ḫān pass on the Qandil Mountains, acting merely as their auxiliaries. Some sources mention a place called Bilād Malāzkurd (Yāzkurd/Barzārkut/Bazārkurd), but its exact location remains uncertain and should not be confused with Mantzikert (Malazgirt) in historic Armenia, which lies far outside the Zarzārī homeland.

== History ==
=== Early History ===
The Zarzārī are among the oldest Kurdish tribes documented in Arabic historiography. They first appear in records through notable individuals such as Al-Adil ibn al-Sallar, who became vizier of Fatimid Egypt in 1148.

=== Military role ===
The Zarzārī were heavily involved in the armies of the Zengids and later the Ayyubids. They were also recruited by the Artuqids of Diyar-Bakr and the Atabegate of Mosul. During the Ayyubid era, many Zarzārī emirs served prominently in the army. Notable military leaders included Šīrkūh b. Bāḫil al-Zarzārī, one of the Ayyubid commanders during the Siege of Acre, and Nūšīrwān al-Zarzārī, who swore allegiance to Al-Afdal after Saladin's death. In addition to their military prominence, the tribe also produced intellectuals such as Ḍiyā' al-Dīn Muḥammad b. ʿUṯmān al-Irbilī al-Kurdī, a commentator on al-Firūzābadī's work.

Imad al-Din al-Isfahani described the Zarzārī troops, part of the Ayyubid army, as: "Zirzariyya who mocked the lion, clothed in bravery and naked of all defect." This reflects the tribe's reputation as fierce and valorous warriors.

== Sources ==
- Öpengin, Ergin (2021). Bozarslan, Hamit; Gunes, Cengiz; Yadirgi, Veli (eds.). The Cambridge History of the Kurds. Cambridge University Press.
- James, Boris (2006). Saladin et les Kurdes: Perception d’un Groupe au Temps des Croisades (in French). Paris: Editions L'Harmattan. ISBN 978-2296001053.
- Bajalan, Djene Rhys; Karimi, Sara Zandi (2017). Studies in Kurdish History: Empire, Ethnicity and Identity. Paris: Taylor & Francis. ISBN 978-2296001053.
