= Marwanid dynasty (Diyar Bakr) =

Kurdish dynasty

Marwanid Emirate
- 983/990–1085
- Capital: Mayyafariqin
- Spoken languages: Kurdish (mother tongue); Arabic (poetry/numismatics)
- Religion: Sunni Islam (official)
- Government: Emirate
- History
  - Established: 983/990
  - Disestablished: 1085
Preceded by
| Buyid dynasty |
| Hamdanid dynasty |
| Bagratid Armenia |
Succeeded by
| Seljuk Empire |
| Shah-Armens |
| Artuqids |

The Marwanid dynasty, also known as the Dustakids, (983/990-1085, Kurdish: میرنشینی مەڕوانی/ میرنشینی دۆستەکی) were a Kurdish Sunni Muslim dynasty in the Diyar Bakr region of Upper Mesopotamia (present day northern Iraq and southeastern Turkey), centered on the city of Mayyafariqin.

== Territory ==
The Marwanid realm in the Diyar Bakr region of Upper Mesopotamia (present day northern Iraq/southeastern Turkey) and Armenia, centered on the city of Amid (Diyarbakır). They also ruled over Akhlat, Bitlis, Manzikert, Nisibis, Erciş, Muradiye, Siirt, Cizre, Hasankayf, and temporarily ruled over Mosul and Edessa.

== History ==
=== Origins ===
The Marwanids hailed from Humaydi Kurdish tribe, who were a sunni Muslims and a part of Cahar-bukhti Kurdish tribal confederation.

The founder of the dynasty was a shepherd, Badh ibn Dustak. He left his cattle, took up arms and became a valiant chief of war, obtaining popularity. When the Buyid emir Adud al-Dawla, who ruled Iraq, died in 983, Badh took Mayyāfāriqīn. He also conquered Diyarbakır, as well as a variety of urban sites on the northern shores of Lake Van.

During the rebellion of Bardas Phokas the Younger in the Byzantine Empire, Bādh took advantage of the chaotic political situation to conquer the plain of Mush in Taron, an Armenian princedom annexed by the Byzantine Empire in 966.

=== Abu Ali Al-Hasan ibn Marwān ===
Elias of Nisibis, a Syriac Christian chronicler, discussed the life of Abu ‘Ali al-Hasan. After the death of his uncle Badh, the elder son of Marwan came back to Hisn-Kayfa, and married the widow of the old warrior chief. He fought the last Hamdanids, confused them and retook all the fortresses. Elias related the tragic end of this prince who was killed in Amid (Diyarbakır) in 997 by rebellious inhabitants. His brother Abu Mansur Sa’id succeeded him under the name of Mumahhid al-Dawla. In 992, after Badh's death and a series of Byzantine punitive raids around Lake Van, Emperor Basil II (r. 976–1025) was able to negotiate a lasting peace with the Kurdish emirate.

=== Mumahhid al-Dawla Sa'id ===
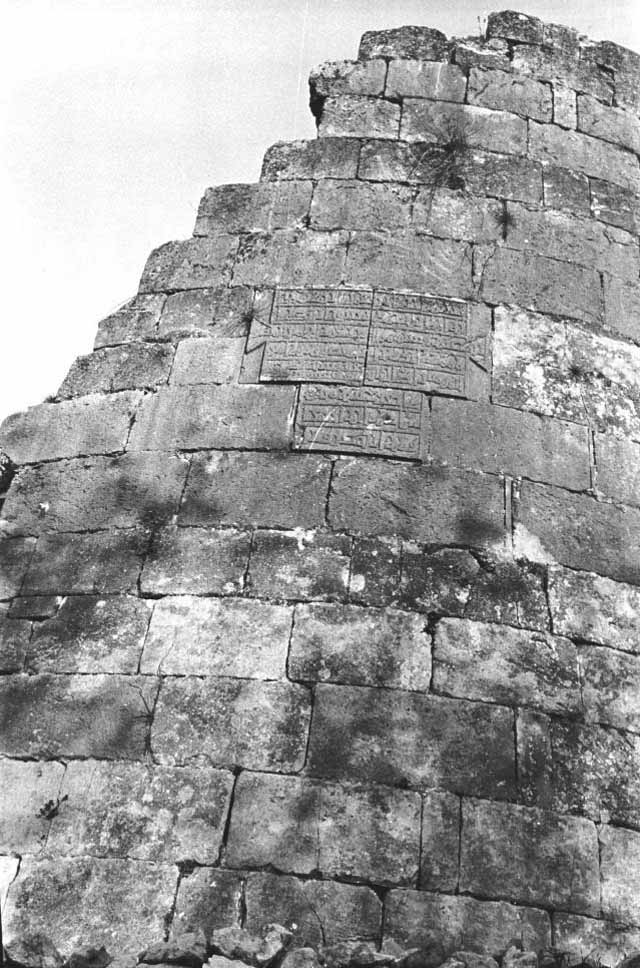
Merwanid Said, 391 AH (c. 1000 AD), Silvan, Diyarbakır, Turkey

Mumahhid, a skilful diplomat, made use of the Byzantines' ambitions. The relations of this prince with Emperor Basil II were quite friendly. When Basil learnt of the murder of the Georgian potentate David III of Tao, who had left his kingdom to the Byzantine Empire by testament, he stopped the campaign that he had begun in Syria to ensure the Arabian emirs' obedience and crossed the Euphrates. He annexed David's state, received Mumahhid al-Dawla with honours and made peace with him. Mumahhid al-Dawla took advantage of the peace to restore the walls of his capital Maïpherqat (Mayyafariqin), where an inscription still commemorates this event.

In 1000 when Basil II travelled from Cilicia to the lands of David III Kuropalates (Akhlat and Manzikert), Mumahhid al-Dawla came to offer his submission to the emperor and in return he received the high rank of magistros and doux of the East.

=== Sharwin ibn Muhammad, usurper ===
In 1010, Mumahhid al-Dawla was assassinated by his ghulam, Sharwin ibn Muhammad, who assumed rulership. He legitimized his rule with the ancient rule that whoever kills the ruler becomes himself the successor. However this archaic rule and Sharwin's rule were soon contested, and Sharwin was overthrown. Coins are known from his brief reign.

=== Nasr al-Dawla Ahmad ibn Marwan ===
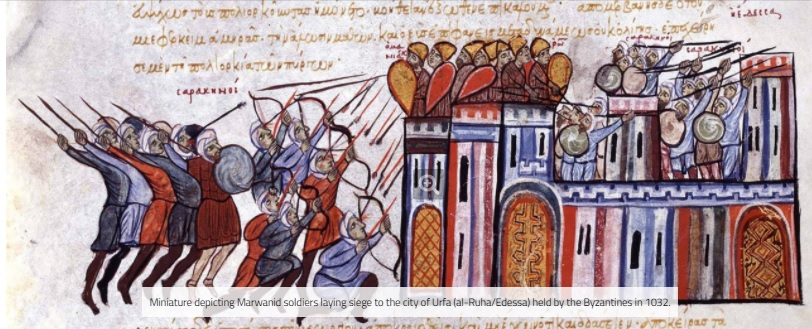
Medieval miniature depicting Marwanid assault on Byzantine Edessa in 1032

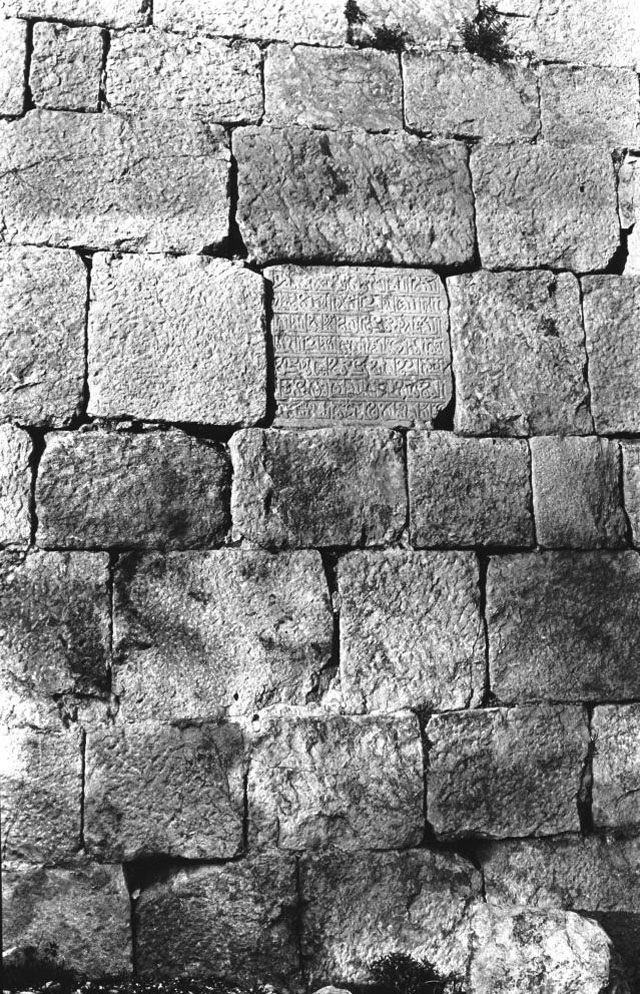
Inscription with Nasr al-Dawla's name, 405 AH (c. 1014 AD), Silvan, Diyarbakır, Turkey

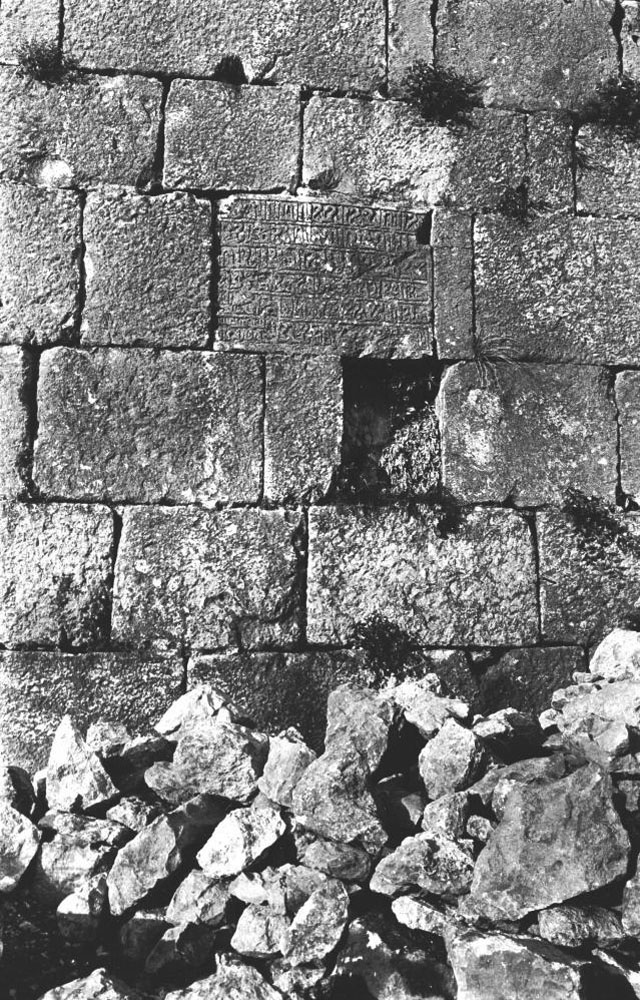
Inscription with Nasr al-Dawla's name, 416 AH (c. 1025 AD), Silvan, Diyarbakır, Turkey

Nasr al-Dawla was the third son of Marwan to ascend the throne. A clever politician, he skilfully navigated between the surrounding great powers: the Buyid emir Sultan al-Dawla, the Fatimid caliph of Egypt al-Hakim and Basil II. Elias of Nisibis has written that Nasr al-Dawla Ahmad ibn Marwan, "the victorious emir", subdued Ibn Dimne, his vassal in Diyarbakır, in 1011. He signed with the Byzantine Empire a pact of mutual non-aggression, but violated it once or twice. The renown of this Kurdish Muslim prince grew so much that the inhabitants of al-Ruha (Edessa, present-day Sanli Urfa), at the west, called him to free them from an Arab chief. Nasr al-Dawla took the city of Edessa in 1026, and added it to his possessions. This event has been reported by the famous western Syriac author Bar Hebraeus (1226–1286). So Nasr al-Dawla annexed Edessa, but the city was retaken by the Byzantine general George Maniakes in 1031. In 1032 he sent an army of 5000 horsemen, under the command of his general Bal, to re-take the town from Arab tribes supported by Byzantium. The Kurdish commander Bal took the city and killed the Arab tribal chief, then he wrote to his lord, asking for reinforcements, "if you want to save your Lordship on Kertastan (Kurdistan)". Al-Ruha was finally captured again by Byzantines in 1033.

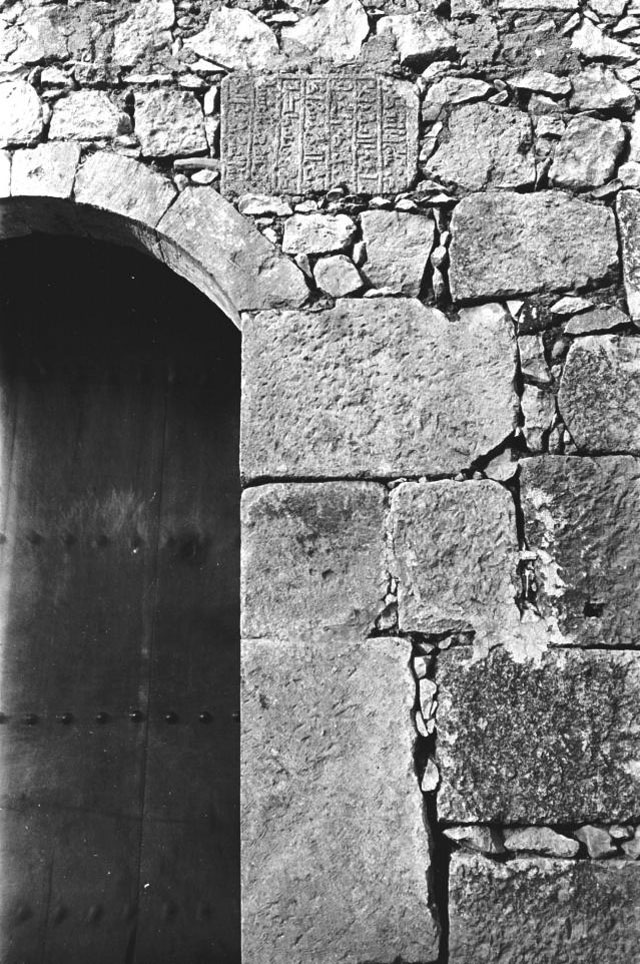
Inscription with Nasr al-Dawla's name, 410 AH (c. 1019 AD), Silvan, Diyarbakır, Turkey

The long rule of Nasr al-Dawla represented the apogee of Marwanid power. He built a new citadel on a hill of Mayyafariqin where the Church of the Virgin stood, and also constructed bridges and public baths, and restored the observatory. Some libraries were established in the mosques of Mayyafarikin and Amid. He invited well-known scholars, historians and poets to his royal court, among them Ibn al-Athir, Abd Allah al-Kazaruni, and al-Tihami. He sheltered political refugees such as the future Abbasid caliph al-Muqtadi (1075–1099). In 1054 he had to acknowledge Toghrul Beg the Seljuq as his own liege, who ruled the largest part of the Jazira, but he kept his territories. This fine period of peace and good feelings between Kurds and Syriacs was rich in cultural creations. It enjoyed extensive trade, vibrant arts and crafts, and an impressive history. Nasr al-Dawla left monumental inscriptions in Diyarbakır that show still now the artistic brightness of his reign.

=== Twilight ===
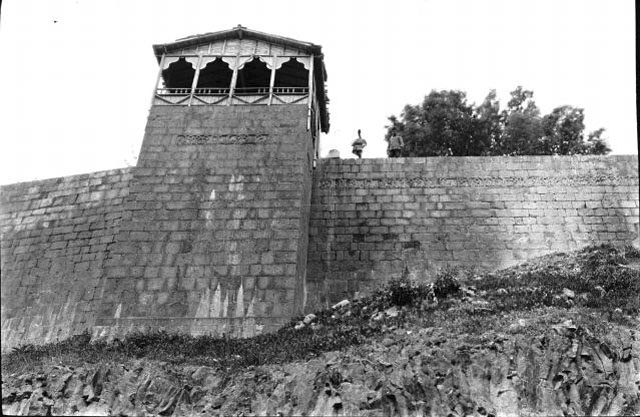
Inscription with Nizam al-Dawla's name, 464 AH (c. 1072 AD), Amida, Diyarbakır, Turkey

After Nasr al-Dawla's death, the Marwanids' power declined. His second son, Nizam, succeeded him and ruled until 1079, then followed his son Nasir al-Dawla Mansur. The end of the Marwanid dynasty came about by treason. Ibn Jahir, a former vizier, left the Diyar Bakr and went to Baghdad. There, he convinced the Seljuq sultan Malik Shah I (1072–1092), a grand-nephew of Toghrul Beg, and the famous vizier Nizam al-Mulk, to allow him to assault Mayyafarikin. When the city was taken, Ibn Jahir took the Marwanids' great treasures for himself. Henceforth, the Diyar Bakr fell almost entirely under the direct rule of the Seljuks. The last emir, Nasir al-Dawla Mansur, kept only the city of Jazirat Ibn ‘Umar (present-day Cizre in south-eastern Turkey). The roots of the Badikan tribe go back to Badh ibn dustak the founder of the Marwanids. This tribe continues its existence in the provinces of Muş, Silvan and Diyarbakır in Turkey. The Malabadi Bridge in Silvan, Diyarbakır takes its name from Bad, the founder of the Marvanids. Malabadi means (house of Bad) in Kurdish.

== List of Marwanid rulers ==
1. Abu Shujā' Badh ibn Dustak (983/990–991)
2. Al-Hasan ibn Marwān (991–997)
3. Mumahhid al-Dawla Sa’īd (997–1010)
4. Sharwin ibn Muhammad (1010), usurper
5. Nasr al-Dawla Ahmad ibn Marwān (1011–1061)
6. Nizām al-Dawla Nasr (1061–1079)
7. Nasir al-Dawla Mansur (1079–1085)

== Military ==
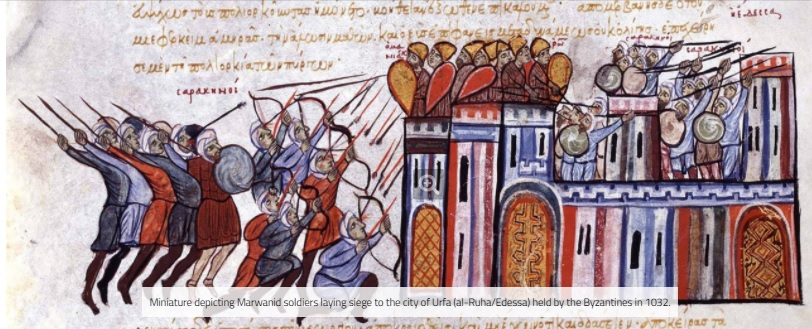
Medieval miniature depicting Marwanid assault on Byzantine Edessa in 1032

The Marwanids based their Military on Kurdish tribesmen, they never needed to employ Turkic Ghilmans like their Buyid Predecessors, because they provided mounted soldiers from their own ranks.

== See also ==
- Dicle Bridge, a ten-arch bridge built in 1065
- List of Kurdish dynasties
- Tarīkh Mayyāfāriqīn

== Sources ==
- Bosworth, C.E (1996). The New Islamic Dynasties. Columbia University Press. p. 89. ISBN 978-0-231-10714-3.
- Bar Hebraeus, Chronique universelle, Mukhtassar al-Duwal, Beirut.
- Chronography of Elias bar Shinaya, Metropolitan of Nisibe, edited and translated into French by L .J. Delaporte, Paris, 1910.
- al-Fāriqī, Ahmad b. Yûsuf b. `Alī b. al-Azraq, Tārīkh al-fāriqī (ed. Badawī `Abd al-Latīf `Awwad). Beirut: Dār al-Kitāb al-Lubnānī, 1984. English summary by H. F. Amedroz, "The Marwanid dynasty at Mayyafariqin in the tenth and eleventh centuries AD", Journal of the Royal Asiatic Society 1903, pp. 123–154.
- Öpengin, Ergin (2021). "The History of Kurdish and the Development of Literary Kurmanji". In Bozarslan, Hamit; Gunes, Cengiz; Yadirgi, Veli (eds.). The Cambridge History of the Kurds. Cambridge University Press. "..Kurdish dynasties were formed (cf. James, 2006, 2007: 110–13; Ripper, 2012: 21), such as the Hasanwayhids, Rawadids (cf. Minorsky, 1953), Ayyubids and Marwanids. Among these, the Marwanid dynasty (983–1085) especially enjoyed considerable economic and cultural prosperity (Ripper, 2012: 21). However, Kurdish, the mother tongue of the rulers of the dynasty, does not seem to have enjoyed any visibility in administration nor in the cultural life at the court. Thus, although the qasida poetry was thriving in the Marwanid court and produced by poets of Kurdish and other origins, the language of its composition and performance is reported to be exclusively Arabic (cf. James, 2007:112; Ripper, 2012: 507–28), while the number of coins from their reign is also in Arabic (cf. Heidemann, 1997–1998)."
