= Muqaddam al-Akrad =

Military rank in the Mamluk army

Muqaddam al-Akrād (Arabic: مقدم الأکراد Muqaddam al-Akrād; lit. 'commander of the Kurds') was a military rank in the Mamluk Sultanate's army, it was given to Kurdish tribal chiefs that served in the rank of the Mamluk army.

This military position was created by the Mamluk regime to mobilize Kurdish tribes, in conflict with the Mongols.

== Purpose ==
The Muqaddam al-Akrād were tasked with: "gathering scattered Kurdish groups, unite the whole groups that have split, and ensure the disputes amongst them are laid to rest in order to be able to use their violence against the infidels, so that they shall cease oppressing each other and begin beating the heathen." Another responsibility was to "convince fellow-Kurds that in the Mamluk Sultanate they would be better off than in their countries of origin".

The Mamluks created this position which "attempted to reinforce and benefit from the Kurdish assabiyya through the creation of a title denoting leadership over the community."

== See also ==
- Amir al-'arab
- Amir al-turkman

== Bibliography ==
- Ayalon, David (2016). Islam and the Abode of War: Military Slaves and Islamic Adversaries. Routledge. ISBN 978-0860784302.
