= Nasr al-Dawla Ahmad ibn Marwan =

Marwanid Kurdish ruler

- Malik

Emir of Marwanids
- Reign: 1011–November 1061: Emir of Marwanids and chief of Bokhti tribe
- Predecessor: Sharwin ibn Muhammad (rival king); Mumahhid al-Dawla Sa’īd (Predecessor )
- Successor: Nizām al-Dawla Nasr
- Born: 981
- Died: November 1061 (aged 79–80)
Names
- Abu Nasr Nasr al-Dawla Ahmad ibn Marwan Al-humaydi
- Dynasty: Marwanids
- Father: Marwan Al-humaydi
- Religion: Sunni Islam

Abu Nasr Ahmad ibn Marwan, also known with the laqab Nasr al-Dawla, was the ruler of the Marwanid Emirate from 1011 to 1061.

Nasr al-Dawla was regarded as the guardian of the Islamic frontier, and as such he was expected to attack Christian territories whenever the opportunity arrived.

== Early life and rise to power ==
Nasr al-Dawla was the third son of Marwan; before his rise to power he lived in semi-exile in Siirt. After Mumahhid al-Dawla's assassination by his gulam Sharwin ibn Muhammad, Nasr al-Dawla was approached by Kurdish tribal chiefs to take over the Marwanid throne. Sharwin ibn Muhammad surrendered himself to Nasr al-Dawla due to lack of support from the local population, and Nasr al-Dawla had him executed.

== Reign ==
During al-Dawla's reign, it was the golden age for Mayafariqin and surrounding areas. In 1026, he seized Edessa from the Romans, but it was recaptured in 1035. The long rule of Nasr al-Dawla represented the apogee of Marwanid power. He built a new citadel on a hill of Mayyafariqin where the Church of the Virgin stood, constructed bridges and public baths, and restored the observatory. Some libraries were established in the mosques of Mayyafarikin and Amid. He invited well-known scholars, historians and poets to his royal court, among them Abd Allah al-Kazaruni, and al-Tihami. He sheltered political refugees such as the future Abbasid caliph al-Muqtadi (1075–1099). In 1054 he had to acknowledge Toghrul Beg the Seljuq as his own liege, who ruled the largest part of the Jazira, but he kept his territories. This fine period of peace and good feelings between Kurds and Syriacs was rich in cultural creations. The period enjoyed extensive trade, vibrant arts and crafts, and an impressive history. Nasr al-Dawla left monumental inscriptions in Diyarbakır that still show the artistic brightness of his reign.

Nasr al-Dawla died in November 1061, at the age of 80. He was succeeded by his son, Nizām Al-Dawla.
