= Badh ibn Dustak =

Kurdish tribal leader

- Amir
- Reign: 983–991
- Successor: Al-Hasan ibn Marwān
- Born: Hizan
- Died: 991; Mosul
Names
- Abu Abdullah al-Husayn bin Dustek al-Baz al-Hamîdî al-Harbukhti
- Dynasty: Çêharbuxtî
- Father: Dustek al-Hamîdî

Abu ʿAbdullah al-Husayn ibn Dustak al-Harbukhti, Abu Shudjaʿ, or simply Baḍ or Baz (died 991) was a Kurdish tribal leader and one of the most important founders of the Marwanid dynasty through the maternal line.

== Appearance ==
Badh is described to have been huge and ugly in appearance.

== Early life ==
Baḍ was most likely born near Hizan. Not much is known about his personal life. As an adult, Baḍ was originally the leader of a group of armed men, a warband perhaps. He supposedly inherited his father's domains, which was a Kurdish tribal federation centered around the towns of Sêrt and Bedlîs that formally acted as a vassal to the Hamdanids. He belonged to the Hamîdî (Hevidi) a branch of Çêharbuxtî (Çar Botan) tribe. However his legacy was also claimed by the Hevidi and Dostikî tribe, The name Dostikî referring to Dustak in his name, who are today known as the Doskî tribe in the Badînan region. He had a sister named Fehm and a brother named Abu 'l-Fawaris Hasan. The latter was killed in a battle against the Buyid dynasty in 987-988 CE.

== Rebellion of Bardas Skleros ==
During his rebellion, Skleros asked for help from Baz who raided Taron and sacked the town of Muş with a large number of soldiers. In 978 or 979, he moved on to capture Malazgirt, which had been ruined by the Byzantines in 968/969 CE. Erciş, Ahlat and Bargiri would later be captured as well.

In 984, he had captured Mayyafaraqin and the whole of the Diyarbakır area.

The roots of the Badkan tribe of Northern Kurdistan go back to Badh ibn Dustak, described as "Kalê Şêx Bad" ("Grandfather Sheikh Badh") by the tribe. This tribe continues its existence in the provinces of Muş, Silvan and Diyarbakır in Turkey. The Malabadi Bridge in Silvan, Diyarbakır, and the Batman River (which in turn gave its name to Batman) take their names from Bad, the founder of the Marvanids. Mala Badi means "house of Badh" in Kurdish, and Bad man is the earlier version of it.

== Death and legacy ==
Baḍ was killed in battle against the Hamdanids. His tomb is said to be located in Sur. In the newspaper Kurdistan, he was portrayed as one of the main Kurdish leaders beside Saladin and Bedir Khan Beg.
