= Ibn al-Azraq al-Fariqi =

Historian and civil servant (c. 1116 – 1176)

Aḥmad b. Yūsuf b. 'Alī b. al-Azraq (c. 1116/17 – c. 1176/77) was a historian and civil servant of the Artuqids and Georgians. He wrote the chronicle Tarīkh Mayyāfāriqīn wa Amid in c. 1164/65. His historical chronicle was copied and referenced by contemporary and later writers.

== Life ==
Ibn al-Azraq was born c. 1116/17 in Mayyafariqin. In 1134/35, Ibn al-Azraq was traveling through nearby regions. By 1136/37 he was in the Jazira, and during a stay in Nasibin he encountered Imad al-Din Zengi. Ibn al-Azraq made several trips to Baghdad, including one in 1139/40 where he remained for six months to study with leading scholars of the period.

Ibn al-Azraq held numerous administrative posts. In 1147/48, he was purchasing copper in al-Ma'dan for the Artuqid ruler Timurtash's mint. The next year al-Azraq was mutawalli ishraf al-waqf (supervisor of charitably endowed property). By 1153/54 he was employed by the King of Georgia, Demetrius I of Georgia, possibly as secretary according to Vladimir Minorsky. After visiting a tomb in Ray, al-Azraq returned to Georgia by 1162/63. He returned to Mayyafariqin in 1166/67 and was appointed mutawalli ishraf al-waqf again. By 1167/68, al-Azraq was in Damascus in the same position, which he held for two years.

Ibn al-Azraq indicates through his writing that he was a supporter of the Artuqid dynasty, although his ethnicity was speculated as being Arab, Kurdish, or Turkish. The historian Vladimir Minorsky believed him to be an Alid supporter, while the historian Carole Hillenbrand indicated he was Sunni Muslim. Al-Azraq receives no notice in biographical works, which points to his marginal status in the Muslim world.

== Tarīkh Mayyāfāriqīn ==
Ibn al-Azraq's employment as a civil servant of Muslim and non-Muslim rulers, gave him access to official documents and chancery records, which he used to write his Tarīkh Mayyāfāriqīn. Al-Azraq's only historical work appears to have been the Tarīkh Mayyāfāriqīn wa Amid. He wrote two versions of this text, the first was written in 1164/65 while the second, an extended version of the first text was written in 1176/77.

The Tarīkh Mayyāfāriqīn was heavily copied and cited by numerous chroniclers namely, Sibt ibn al-Jawzi, Ibn Khallikan, Izz al-Din ibn Shaddad, and Ibn Wasil.

== Sources ==
- Hillenbrand, Carole (1979). The History of the Jazīra 1100–1150: the contribution of Ibn Al-Azraq al-Fāriqī (PhD thesis). Vol. 1. University of Edinburgh. hdl:1842/7341.
- Hillenbrand, Carole (1990). A Muslim Principality in Crusader Times: The Early Artuqid State. Peeters Publishers. ISBN 978-9062580668.
- Thomas, David; Mallett, Alexander, eds. (2011). "Ibn Al-Azraq". Christian-Muslim Relations. A Bibliographical History. Vol. 3: (1050-1200). Brill. ISBN 9789004216167.

== See also ==
- Tarīkh Mayyāfāriqīn
