= Muhammad ibn Ibrahim al-Khazraji =

Ayyubid scholar

Muḥammad ibn Ibrāhīm al-Khazrajī (died 1258 AD [656 AH]), also known as Ibn al-Khazrajī, was an Arab scholar and historian of the late Ayyubid period. A member of the Banū Khazraj and a native of Tlemcen, he taught ḥadīth in Alexandria. His work, which survives only in part, is based largely on that of Sibt ibn al-Jawzi. It is known by the title Taʾrīkh al-Dawlat al-Akrād wal-Atrāk ("History of the Kurdish and Turkish Empire"). It is arranged on a year-by-year basis and in each year a prominent jurist, poet or similar who died that year is celebrated with anecdotes. In its independent passages, it is a valuable source of Ayyubid history. It can be found in the manuscript Süleymaniye Kütüphanesi, MS Hekimoğlu Ali Paşa 695.

== Editions ==
- Muhammad ibn Ibrahim ibn Muhammad ibn Abi al-Fawaris Abd al-Aziz al-Ansari al-Khazraji, History of the Kurdish and Turkish Empire (1176–1200). Partial English translation from the Arabic with annotations by Fahmy Hafez. Ph.D. dissertation, University of Melbourne, 1985.

== Bibliography ==
- Hafez, Fahmy (1999). "The Crusades and the Era of Saladin". International Journal of Kurdish Studies. 13 (1): 1–14.
- Humphreys, R. Stephen (1977). From Saladin to the Mongols: The Ayyubids of Damascus, 1193–1260. State University of New York Press.
- Meho, Lokman I. (1997). The Kurds and Kurdistan: A Selective and Annotated Bibliography. Greenwood Press.
- Satō, Tsugitaka (1997). State and Rural Society in Medieval Islam: Sultans, Muqtaʿs and Fallahun. E. J. Brill.
