= Carole Hillenbrand =

British Islamic scholar (born 1943)

Carole Hillenbrand CBE FBA (born 1943), is a British Islamic scholar who is Emerita Professor in Islamic History at the University of Edinburgh and Professor of Islamic History at the University of St Andrews. She is the Vice-President of the British Society for Middle Eastern Studies and a Member of the Council for Assisting Refugee Academics.

== Early life ==
Hillenbrand was born in 1943 in England. In 1962, she enrolled at Girton College, Cambridge, where she studied modern languages. She then attended Somerville College at Oxford, where she studied Arabic and Turkish.

== Academic career ==
Hillenbrand gained a BA in Modern and Medieval Languages from the University of Cambridge in 1965 and a BA in Oriental Studies from the University of Oxford in 1972. She earned her PhD at the University of Edinburgh in 1979. Her thesis, The history of the Jazira 1100–1150: the contribution of Ibn Al-Azraq al-Fariqi, analysed and translated a pair of British Library manuscripts of a text by the 12th-century Artuqid historian ibn al-Azraq al-Fariqi.

Her research interests include: the Crusades; Islamic political thought; medieval and modern concepts of jihad; Arabic and Persian travel literature. Dr. Hillenbrand serves on the editorial boards of several academic journals including the Journal of Arabic and Islamic Studies and the International Advisory Board of The UMRAN – International Journal of Islamic and Civilizational Studies, University of Technology, Malaysia.

Invited by an interviewer in 2018 to venture an opinion on whether the Muslims who had encountered westerners in the Holy Land during the time of the crusades had seen the best of Western Christendom in their midst, Hillenbrand agreed that - with notable and distinguished exceptions - they almost certainly had not: "The most important thing that most of the crusaders who remained in the Holy Land learned ... was to use soap".

== Honours ==
- 2005: Hillenbrand was the first non-Muslim to be awarded the King Faisal International Prize for Islamic Studies.
- 2009: New Year Honours as Hillenbrand was appointed as Officer of the Order of the British Empire (OBE).
- 2016: Awarded the Nayef Al-Rodhan Prize for Global Cultural Understanding by the British Academy for her book Islam: A New Historical Introduction.
- 2018: Hillenbrand was appointed Commander of the Most Excellent Order of the British Empire (CBE) in the 2018 Queen's Birthday Honours "for services to the Understanding of Islamic History". In the same year she also became an Honorary Fellow of Somerville College, Oxford.

== Works ==
- The Crusades: Islamic Perspectives (2000)
- Islam: A New Historical Introduction. London: Thames & Hudson Ltd. (2015) ISBN 978-0-500-11027-0
