= Muradiye =

- District and municipality
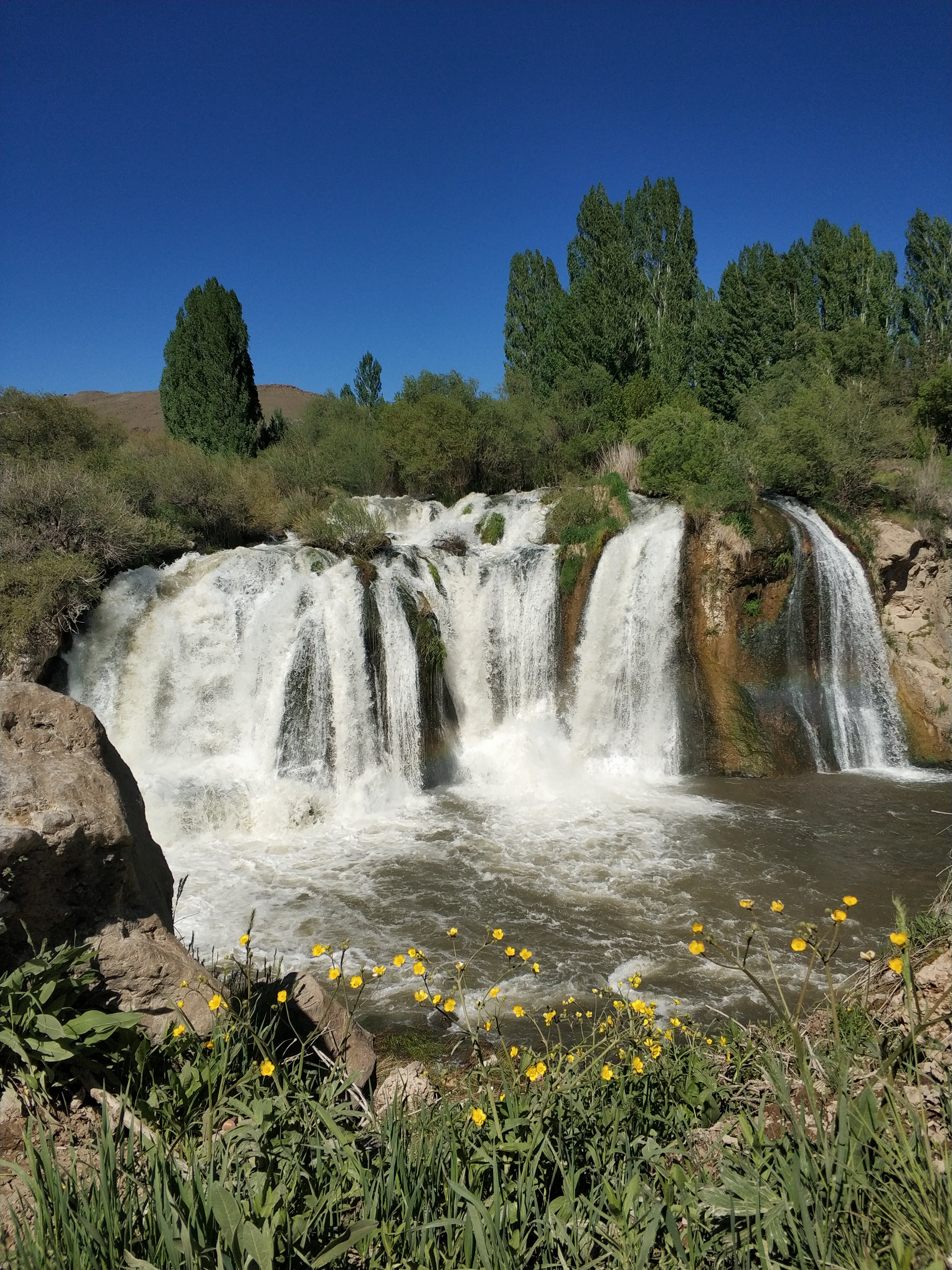
- Muradiye Waterfalls

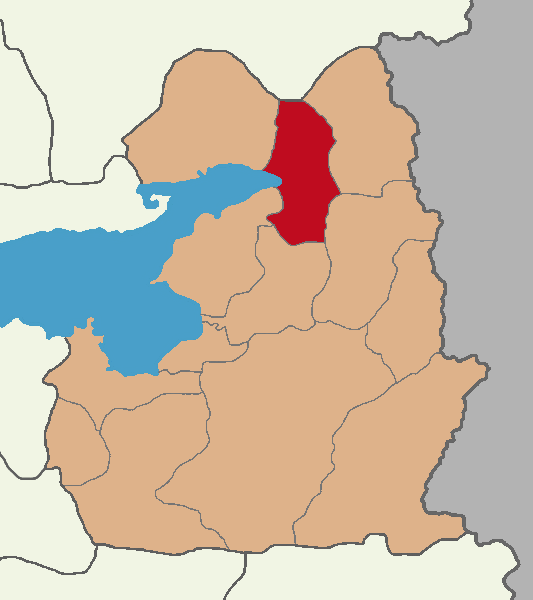
- Map showing Muradiye District in Van Province

- Location within Turkey
- Coordinates: 38°59′41″N 43°46′05″E
- Country: Turkey
- Province: Van
- Area: 912 km^{2} (352 sq mi)
- Elevation: 1,700 m (5,600 ft)
- Population (2022): 45,718
  - Density: 50.1/km^{2} (130/sq mi)
- Time zone: UTC+3 (TRT)
- Postal code: 65500
- Area code: 0432
- Website: www.muradiye.bel.tr

Muradiye (Kurdish: Bêgirî, Armenian: Բերկրի, romanized: Berkri) is a municipality and district of Van Province, Turkey. Its area is 912 km^{2}, and its population is 45,718 (2022). It is best known for its impressive waterfalls.

== History ==
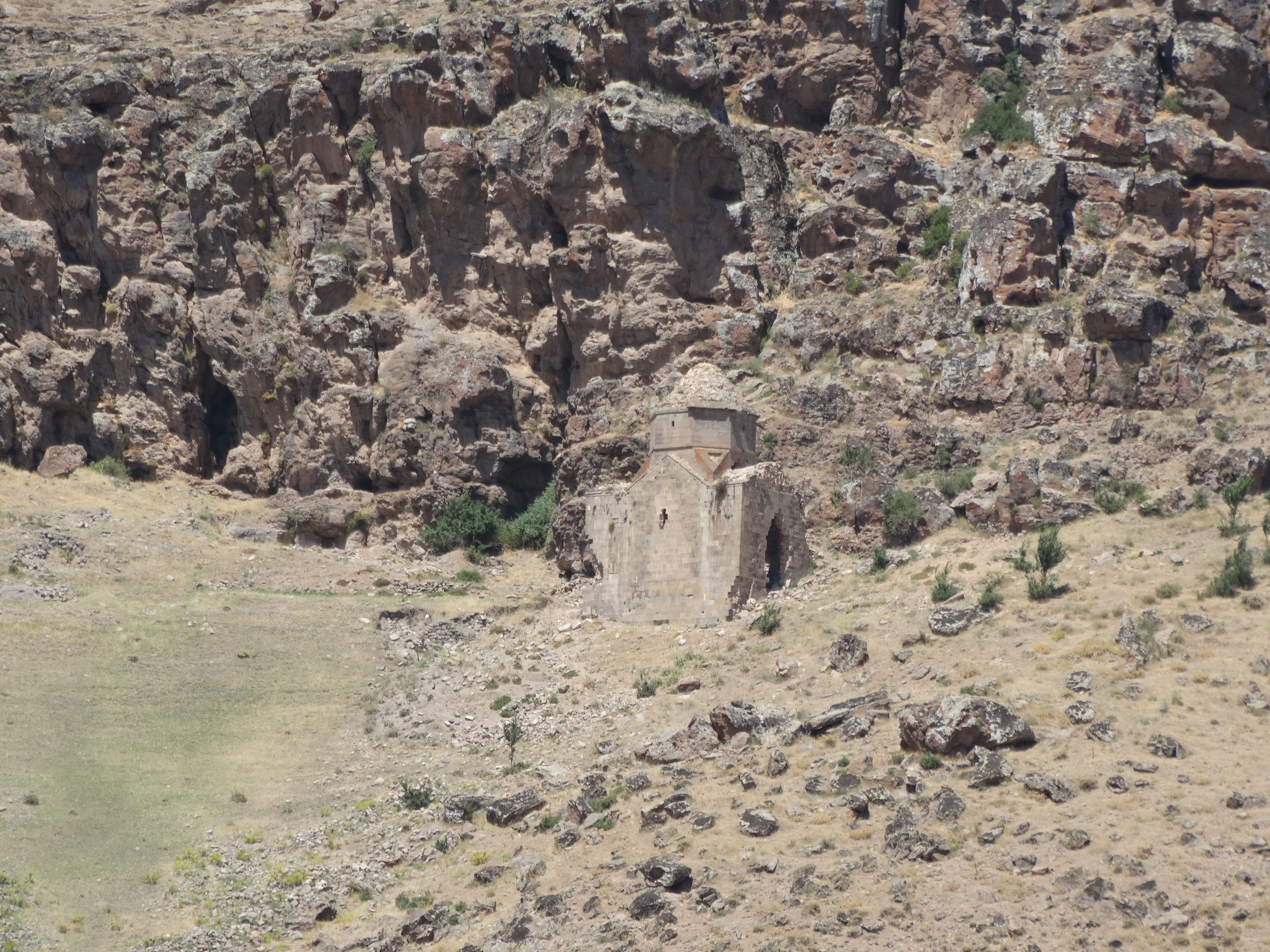
Remains of the St. Stephen Armenian Church

The tenth-century Byzantine text De Administrando Imperio mentions "Perkri" belonging to King Ashot I Bagratuni at the beginning of the ninth century before being turned over to an Arab ruler, Abu'l-Ward. After the death of Ashot's son, Smbat I, another Arab ruler, Abu Sawada, took possession of Berkri.

=== Forced evacuations ===
The Muradiye district also experienced forced evacuations of some of its inhabitants as a consequence of the Turkish-Kurdish conflict.

== Government ==
Mehmet Ali Tunç was elected mayor in the local elections 2014. He was detained and a trustee was appointed instead in January 2017. In the local elections in March 2019, Yılmaz Şalan from the Peoples' Democratic Party (HDP) was elected mayor. On the 6 November 2019, Şalan was arrested due to charges relating to terrorism. The current Kaymakam is Erkan Savar.

== Composition ==
There are 48 neighbourhoods in Muradiye District:

- Açıkyol
- Adaklı
- Akbulak
- Akçaçay
- Alkasnak
- Aşağı Argıt
- Babacan
- Balaklı
- Beşparmak
- Beydağı
- Çakmak
- Çiçekli
- Dağören
- Devetaş
- Doğangün
- Dürükkaş
- Erişen
- Esenkoç
- Fatih
- Fevzi Çakmak
- Gönderme
- Görecek
- Güllüçimen
- Gültepe
- Gümüştepe
- Kandahar
- Karahan
- Karaoğlan
- Keçikıran
- Kemerköprü
- Kocasaban
- Köşkköy
- Kuşçu
- Otlakbaşı
- Ovapınar
- Sarımehmet
- Şehitmehmetbey
- Sürüyolu
- Tansu
- Topuzarpa
- Uluşar
- Ünseli
- Yakıncak
- Yalındüz
- Yavuz Selim
- Yenişehir
- Yukarı Argıt
- Yumaklı

== Climate ==
The climate in Muradiye, with hot, dry summer, and cold, snowy winters, can be classified a humid continental climate (Köppen: Dsa).

Climate data for Muradiye (1991–2020)
Month	Jan	Feb	Mar	Apr	May	Jun	Jul	Aug	Sep	Oct	Nov	Dec	Year
Mean daily maximum °C (°F)	0.8 (33.4)	2.1 (35.8)	7.0 (44.6)	13.7 (56.7)	19.7 (67.5)	26.3 (79.3)	31.2 (88.2)	31.6 (88.9)	26.3 (79.3)	18.4 (65.1)	10.2 (50.4)	3.3 (37.9)	16.0 (60.8)
Daily mean °C (°F)	−4.4 (24.1)	−3.3 (26.1)	1.6 (34.9)	7.8 (46.0)	13.1 (55.6)	18.6 (65.5)	23.1 (73.6)	22.9 (73.2)	17.6 (63.7)	11.1 (52.0)	4.1 (39.4)	−1.6 (29.1)	9.3 (48.7)
Mean daily minimum °C (°F)	−8.7 (16.3)	−7.7 (18.1)	−2.7 (27.1)	2.7 (36.9)	7.1 (44.8)	11.3 (52.3)	15.7 (60.3)	15.4 (59.7)	9.9 (49.8)	4.7 (40.5)	−0.9 (30.4)	−5.7 (21.7)	3.5 (38.3)
Average precipitation mm (inches)	45.2 (1.78)	46.23 (1.82)	61.88 (2.44)	76.36 (3.01)	56.25 (2.21)	26.39 (1.04)	17.97 (0.71)	9.28 (0.37)	23.37 (0.92)	43.08 (1.70)	52.1 (2.05)	56.23 (2.21)	514.34 (20.25)
Average precipitation days (≥ 1.0 mm)	6.6	7.3	10.0	10.7	9.9	4.3	3.2	2.4	3.7	5.9	6.9	8.1	79.0
Average relative humidity (%)	67.2	66.4	65.1	61.7	57.5	49.0	43.0	41.6	48.0	59.5	63.6	67.2	57.8
Source: NOAA

== Education ==
In the early 2000s, there was reported a lack of teachers. Teachers were teaching more than 50 children per average.

== Earthquake ==
In 1976 an earthquake occurred in Muradiye, Van, and caused the death of about 3,640 people and leaving 51,000 people homeless.

== See also ==
- 1976 Çaldıran–Muradiye earthquake
