= Daseni =

Yazidi Kurdish tribe

Dasini (Arabic: الداسنية al-Dāsinīyya; Kurdish: داسنی Dasnî) or Daseni, Tasini, Dasiki, is a Kurdish Yazidi tribe and ethnonym of Yazidis. The tribe resided near Mosul, Duhok, Sheikhan, Sinjar and all the way to the west bank of Greater Zab river.

There was also present of Daseni tribe in Homs Governorate, Syria. They were called Akrād Al-Daseniya "Daseni Kurds", who still spoke Kurdish for generations.

== Name ==
The Yazidis call themselves Dāsin, Dasnī, Dasenī, plurally as Dawāsīn, Duāsin, Dawāšim, the origin of the name probably comes from an old Nestorian diocese. Yazidis are called Dasnāyē or Dasnîyê in Syriac. The name of Dâsin (plur. Dawâsin) itself is derived from old Iranic language *daêvaysna which means "Daeva worshippers".

Sharafkhan Bidlisi called them as Akrad-e Yezidi and Kurdi-ye raddi-ye Yezidi, which means "Yazidi Kurds".

== History ==
=== Origins ===
According to 14th century historian, Ibn Fadlallah, the Daseni tribe were a branch of Bokhti Kurdish tribe.

The Dasini adhered to Adawiyya, the predecessor of Yazidism. In 906, the Dasinis rebelled against the Hamdanid rule. Establishing the Shaykhan principality, centered in Sheikhan. Dasini are mentioned by yaqut al-hamawi as residing in "Jabal Dasin". in 14th century, it was recorded by al-'Umari that Akre was resided by Dasinis. in 15th century, The Daseni were Attacked by the Bahdinan Emirate.

== Notable people ==
- Davud Hussein Beg-i Dasini (c.1556), governor of Takrit
- Ezidi Mirza (1600–1651), Beylerbey of Mosul

== See also ==
- List of Kurdish dynasties and countries
- Yazidis
- Kurdish tribes
- Kilis Emirate
- Sheikhan principality
