= Fadl ibn Rabi'a =

12th Cenuty Arab Emir

- Born: Abū Imrān Fadl ibn Rābi'a; Mecca
- Died: Syria
- Burial: Damascus

Abu Imran Fadl ibn Rabi'a (Note: Full name and genealogy: Abu Imran Faḍl ibn Rabīʿa ibn Ḥaẓim ibn ʿAlī ibn Mufarrij ibn Daghfal ibn al-Jarrāh at-Ṭaʾī) was an Arab emir in Syria in the early 12th century. Most of what is known of him centers on his military activities in circa 1107. He was the ancestor of the Al Fadl dynasty, which ruled the Bedouin tribes of the Syrian Desert and steppe between the 12th and 18th centuries.

== Biography ==
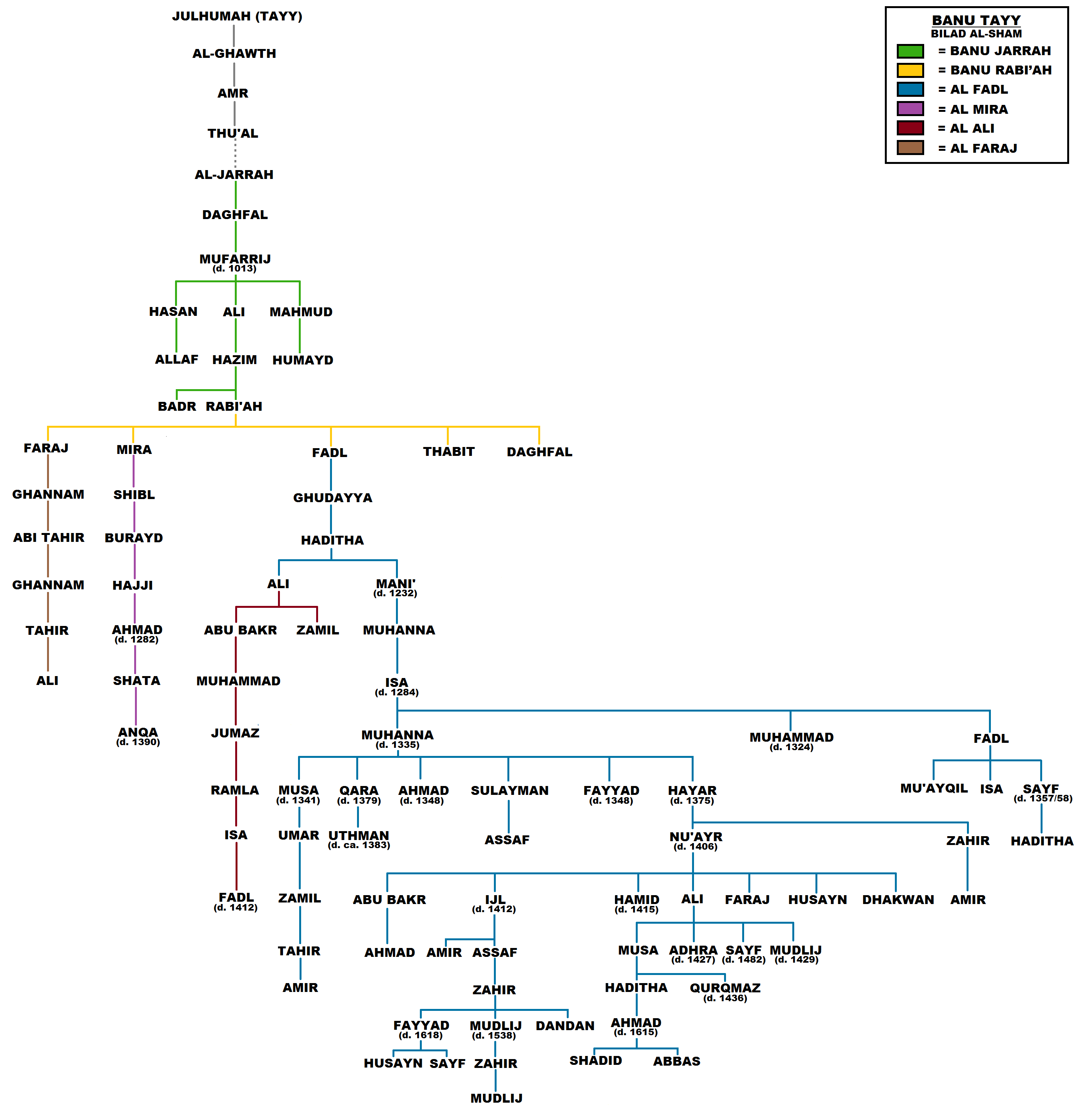
Genealogy of the Banu Tayy tribe of Syria. The Al Fadl branch of the tribe is depicted by the blue line

Fadl was a son of Rabi'a ibn Hazim, a great-grandson of Mufarrij ibn Daghfal, the Jarrahid ruler of Palestine in the late 10th and early 11th centuries. The Jarrahids were part of the much larger Banu Tayy tribe. His father Rabi'a was aligned with Seljuks. But later Fadl quarreled with the Burid ruler of Damascus, Toghtekin, who expelled him from Syria in 1107/08. Afterward, he sought refuge with and formed a pact with Sadaqa, the Mazyadid ruler of Hillah south of Baghdad.

When Sadaqa challenged the Seljuk sultan in Baghdad, Fadl at first fought alongside him in the vanguard, but then defected to the Seljuks. Upon his arrival in Baghdad, he and his tribesmen were rewarded and given lodging at Sadaqa's former Baghdad residence. Fadl sought to cut off Sadaqa's desert route toward Syria and asked permission to pursue his strategy. The Seljuks gave Fadl their blessing, but once he crossed the Euphrates River in Anbar, nothing is known of his fate.

=== Legacy ===
Fadl was the father of a certain Ghudayya, and the ancestor of his namesake tribe, the Al Fadl, whose emirs and descendants ruled the Bedouin of the Syrian Desert and steppe on behalf of the Ayyubids, Mamluks, and early Ottomans until at least the early 17th century. Later, part of Fadl's descendants became known as Al Abu Risha, and took over the leadership of the Mawali tribe, and continued to serve as the hereditary leaders of the Bedouin in the Syrian Desert until the invasion of Anaza tribesmen from Najd in the 18th century. The other part of Al Fadl migrated to the Golan Heights and Beqaa Valley, where they eventually abandoned their nomadic way of life and adopted farming, and have continued to go by the name of Al Fadl. They were displaced from the Golan Heights after the Israeli occupation in the 1967 Six-Day War and have since lived in the vicinity of Damascus.
