= Al Mira =

The Al Mira (alternatively Al Murra or Al Muri) was the preeminent Bedouin tribe of the Hauran region of Syria during Mamluk rule (1260–1516) and the first few years of Ottoman rule (1516–1918). The Al Mira was one of the two principal branches of the Tayy tribe of Banu Rabi'a, descended from the 10th-century Jarrahids; the other main branch was the Al Fadl, who were centered in the Syrian steppe around Salamiyah and Palmyra. As the paramount leaders of the Hauran-area Bedouin, the emirs of the Al Mira were entrusted by the Mamluk authorities with keeping order among the tribes, supplying the Mamluks with horses, guarding Syria's desert frontiers and the roads which passed through the Hauran, ensuring the safety of the Hajj caravans from to and from Mecca. By the early Ottoman period, their influence gave way to another Tayy tribe, the Mafarija–Sardiyya.

== Territory ==
The territory of the Al Mira and their allies extended from the Golan (Jawlan in Arabic) through the Harra volcanic desert toward Mecca. While their influence may have extended this length, their roaming area was more closely concentrated in the Hauran, between the Golan and the environs of al-Zarqa, with only a portion of the tribe seasonally migrating further south into the Harra.

== History ==
=== Origins ===
The Al Mira were descended from the Jarrahids, the preeminent family of the Tayy tribe from the late 10th to 11th centuries. The Tayy dominated the deserts of northern Najd and the Jarrahids in particular were centered in the Transjordanian highlands, at times controlling an emirate in Palestine during the Fatimid era. An emir of the Jarrahids, Rabi'a ibn Hazim, grandson of the Jarrahid emir Mufarrij ibn Daghfal ibn al-Jarrah, was the leading emir of the Bedouin tribes of southern Syria (including Hauran and Transjordan) during the reign of the Seljuk atabeg Toghtekin (r. 1103–1128) of Damascus. Mira, the progenitor of the Al Mira, and Fadl, the progenitor of the Al Fadl, were sons of Rabi'a and were recognized in the sources for their support of Tughtakin and his successors, the Zengids and then Ayyubids. When they were on the outs with these Muslim rulers of Syria, Fadl and Mira were conversely known to cause them troubles by leading raids against the Syrian countryside and trade and Hajj routes.

The descendants of Rabi'a were collectively known as the 'Banu Rabi'a'. Beginning during the reign of Ayyubid sultan al-Adil I, emirs of the Banu Rabi'a were appointed to a new office, amir al-arab, as a means to regulate the Bedouin tribes of the Syrian desert and steppe. The first such emir was a member of the Al Fadl, Haditha ibn Ghudayya ibn Fadl. Under al-Adil's successors, the office of amir al-arab switched hands between descendants of Haditha, specifically his sons Mani and Ali and their progeny (Mani's descendants, the Al Muhanna, became the leading branch of the Al Fadl in the 13th century and Ali's descendats became another prominent branch, the Al Ali), as well as another branch of the Banu Rabi'a, that of the Al Faraj under its emir Ghannam ibn Abi Tahir ibn Ghannam. The emirs vied for the office and were appointed by both the Ayyubid sultan of Egypt and the lesser Ayyubid leaders of Syria's principalities (Damascus, Aleppo, Hama and Homs), with multiple emirs serving concurrently at times.

=== Mamluk period ===
The Al Mira's star rose with the onset of Mamluk rule in Syria in 1260. Under the Mamluk sultan Baybars, Isa ibn Muhanna of the Al Muhanna/Al Fadl, his cousin Zamil ibn Ali ibn Haditha of the Al Ali/Al Fadl, and Ahmad ibn Tahir ibn Ghannam all struggled for the emirate, with Isa eventually overcoming his opponents. Isa was challenged early on by the Al Mira, specifically its emir, Isa's powerful cousin Shihab al-Din Ahmad ibn Hajji ibn Burayd ibn Shibl ibn Mira. By this time, the Al Mira became known as the muluk al-arab ('kings of the Bedouin') of southern Syria, i.e. the Hauran and Transjordan. According to Ibn Khaldun, the Al Mira drove the Al Fadl out of the Hauran. The struggle between Al Mira and Al Fadl subsided when Baybars made the Al Mira in southern Syria practically independent of the amir al-arab, whose authority became confined to the central and northern Syrian steppe and was almost exclusively in the hands of the Al Fadl thereafter.

In the mid or late 1260s, Ahmad ibn Hajji raided across Najd and Hejaz and extorted thousands of camels from the governor of Medina. Upon orders of the sultan, Ahmad restored the camels to Medina in 1268. In 1278, Ahmad and Isa ibn Muhanna visited the sultan in Cairo but soon gavr their backing to the rebel Mamluk emir Sunqur al-Ashqar in Syria. Both returned to the sultan's allegiance in 1281 when they led Bedouin contingents in the Mamluk army against the Ilkhanid Mongols at the Battle of Homs; the Al Mira counted some 4,000 horsemen according to the Mamluk-era sources. By the time of Ahmad's death in 1282, he had become an enemy of Isa ibn Muhanna.

Around 1389, Ahmad's descendant Anqa ibn Shati had become emir of the Al Mira. He and the emir of the Al Fadl, Nu'ayr ibn Hayar ibn Muhanna, joined forces with the Mamluk rebel emir Mintash in the civil war pitting them against Sultan Barquq. The rebels besieged Aleppo, but were ultimately driven off by the forces of Barquq. Anqa was killed by the Assassins in 1390 or 1391. The Al Mira returned to Barquq's allegiance following his victory.

In the chaotic aftermath of Tamerlane's invasion of Syria in 1400–1401, the Al Mira seized the grain harvests of the Hauran. The Mamluk authorities launched a punitive expedition against them the following year, attacking them in Suwayda and capturing thousands of their camels. Later in the 15th century, the historian Khalil al-Zahiri noted that the Al Mira had 1,000 horsemen, as compared to the 24,000 of the Al Fadl, the 2,000 of Al Ali and the 1,000 combined of Banu Mahdi and Banu Uqba (the latter two in Transjordan). In 1488, the emir of Al Mira, Janbay, was backed by the Mamluk authorities in a campaign against a Bedouin foe, Amir ibn Muqlid. He was assisted against a rival Bedouin clan, the Al Bayyad, in 1511. The contemporary Damascene historian Ibn Tulun notes that Janbay was celebrated by the Hajj pilgrims he protected on their return to Syria.

=== Ottoman period ===
The Ottoman Empire conquered Mamluk Syria in 1516. In the leadup to the Ottomans' entry into Damascus, the Mamluk governor of Damascus, Janbirdi al-Ghazali, sought to bring the local Bedouin powers, including the Al Mira, to his side and awarded Janbay a robe of honor and entrusted him with guarding the roads of the Hauran and the Marj plain around Damascus. By appeasing Janbay, he also sought the goodwill of Janbay's brother-in-law Nasir al-Din Ibn Hanash, the leading Bedouin emir of the Beqaa Valley. The Ottomans under Sultan Selim I (r. 1512–1520 conquered Damascus with relative ease; Janbirdi was kept as governor and Ibn al-Hanash was confirmed in his position in the Beqaa Valley by Selim I but the fate of the Al Mira's emir is not mentioned in accounts of the event. During the years immediately following the Ottoman conquest, another tribe of the Tayy, Banu Lam-Mafarija and one of its leading factions, the Sardiyya, emerge as the principal Bedouin power of the Hauran.

== Duties and ranks ==
The emir of the Al Mira, as well as the emir of the Banu Mahdi, which was entrusted with control of the Balqa (central Transjordan), and the emir of the Jarm of Gaza, held ranks equivalent to an amir ashara (emir of ten mamluks) or the subgovernors of Damascus city and the Damascus countryside.

The duties of the Al Mira in the Hauran were spelled out in a sultanic decree dating to 1333. They were entrusted to confine the Bedouin within their tribal territory and not migrate; to guard Syria's desert frontier; to acquire fine horses for the sultan; to administer the Sharia, regulating marriages and inheritances per Islamic law. In effect, the emir of the Al Mira wielded the power of a provincial governor over his domains. Under the Mamluks, the Al Mira were charged with protecting the Hajj caravan through the Hauran; as it traveled further south through the Balqa, protection of the caravan became the responsibility of the Banu Mahdi. During a siege of the desert fortress town of al-Karak in 1340, Sultan al-Nasir Muhammad charged the Al Mira and the Al Fadl with guarding the roads leading to al-Karak.

== Bibliography ==
- Bakhit, Muhammad Adnan Salamah (February 1972). The Ottoman Province of Damascus in the Sixteenth Century (PhD). School of Oriental and African Studies, University of London.
- Hiyari, Mustafa A. (1975). "The Origins and Development of the Amīrate of the Arabs during the Seventh/Thirteenth and Eighth/Fourteenth Centuries". Bulletin of the School of Oriental and African Studies. 38 (3): 509–524. doi:10.1017/s0041977x00048060. JSTOR 613705. S2CID 178868071.
- Rapoport, Yossef (2025). Becoming Arab: The Formation of Arab Identity in the Medieval Middle East. Princeton: Princeton University Press. ISBN 9780691210636.
- Tritton, A. S. (1948). "The Tribes of Syria in the Fourteenth and Fifteenth Centuries". Bulletin of the School of Oriental and African Studies. 12 (3/4): 567–573. doi:10.1017/s0041977x00083129. JSTOR 608712. S2CID 161392172.
