= Sardiyya =

- Bedouin
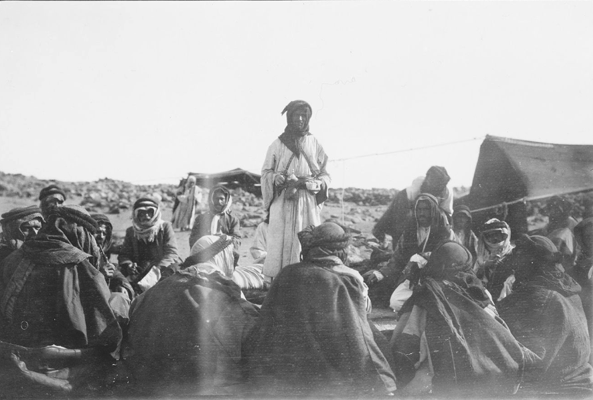
- Tribesmen of the Sardiyya in the Hamad desert region of modern Jordan, 1913
- Nisba: Sardī
- Location: Southeastern Syria and northern Jordan
- Descended from: Mafarija—Banu Lam (of Tayy)
- Branches: Al Fawwaz
- Religion: Islam

The Sardiyya (also spelled Sardiyah, Sardiyeh or Suradiyya) are an Arab tribe largely concentrated in southern Syria and northern Jordan. They first appear in the 16th century as a faction of the Mafarija, itself a faction of the Banu Lam of the numerous Tayy tribe. From the mid-16th to mid-18th centuries, they dominated the section of the Syrian desert and steppe between Damascus and al-Karak, including the Hauran, Jabal Ajlun and Balqa regions. Their chiefs formally held office under the Ottoman Empire entrusting them with authority over the Bedouin of this region and with protection of the Hajj pilgrim caravan route which crossed it. Their influence and authority gradually gave way to their rivals, the Beni Sakhr, during the first half of the 18th century.

== Origins ==
The Sardiyya were one of four branches of the Mafarija (also spelled Mufarija), a Bedouin tribe which formed part of the Banu Lam. The Mafarija are sometimes referred to in the sources as 'Banu Lam Mafarija'. The Banu Lam were a branch of the numerous and wide-ranging Tayy tribe of northern Arabia and the Fertile Crescent. By the late 12th and early 13th centuries, Tayy tribes were largely in control of the Syrian desert and steppe extending from northern Najd in the south to the Euphrates valley in the north. Overarching control was in the hands of the Tayy tribe of Banu Rabi'a, specifically its three leading branches: the Al Fadl, Al Mira and Al Ali, which dominated parts of this tribal zone. Within the Banu Rabi'a's sphere of influence were other Tayy tribes, including the Banu Lam, which dwelt in the highlands of Jabal Aja and Jabal Salma (collectively referred to as Jabal Shammar) in northern Arabia, alongside another Tayy tribe, the Shammar.

The Banu Lam later migrated to the northern Hejaz, and eventually to southern Transjordan. By the late 15th century, they were the dominant tribe in this region, specifically the environs of al-Karak and the Balqa plateau. The Lam are frequently referenced in the Mamluk-era (1260–1517) sources "because of their constant attacks" on the Hajj pilgrim caravans to and from Mecca, according to the historian David Ayalon. The tribe inhabited an "inhospitable terrain" and "eked out an existence marginal even by Bedouin standards", in the words of the historian Carl Petry. He posits that the Banu Lam's poverty drove "their perennial raiding". The Banu Lam were recorded by the Syrian geographer Abu al-Fida to have attacked a caravan of Muslim pilgrims around the Karak fortress on their return from the Hajj in 1314. The Damascene notary Ibn Tawq, reporting during the years 1480–1500, recorded numerous attacks by the Banu Lam–Mafarija, sometimes backed by tribes from Jabal Nablus, against the villages of the Hauran, causing the flight of peasants from the region. Looting raids were recorded against the Hajj pilgrim caravan by the Banu Lam in 1491, 1494, 1499 and 1500. During the reign of Sultan al-Ghawri (r. 1501–1516), the Banu Lam were the most unruly of the Bedouin tribes in the realm, frequently raiding Palestine between 1506 and 1515.

== Ottoman era ==
=== Emergence and heyday ===
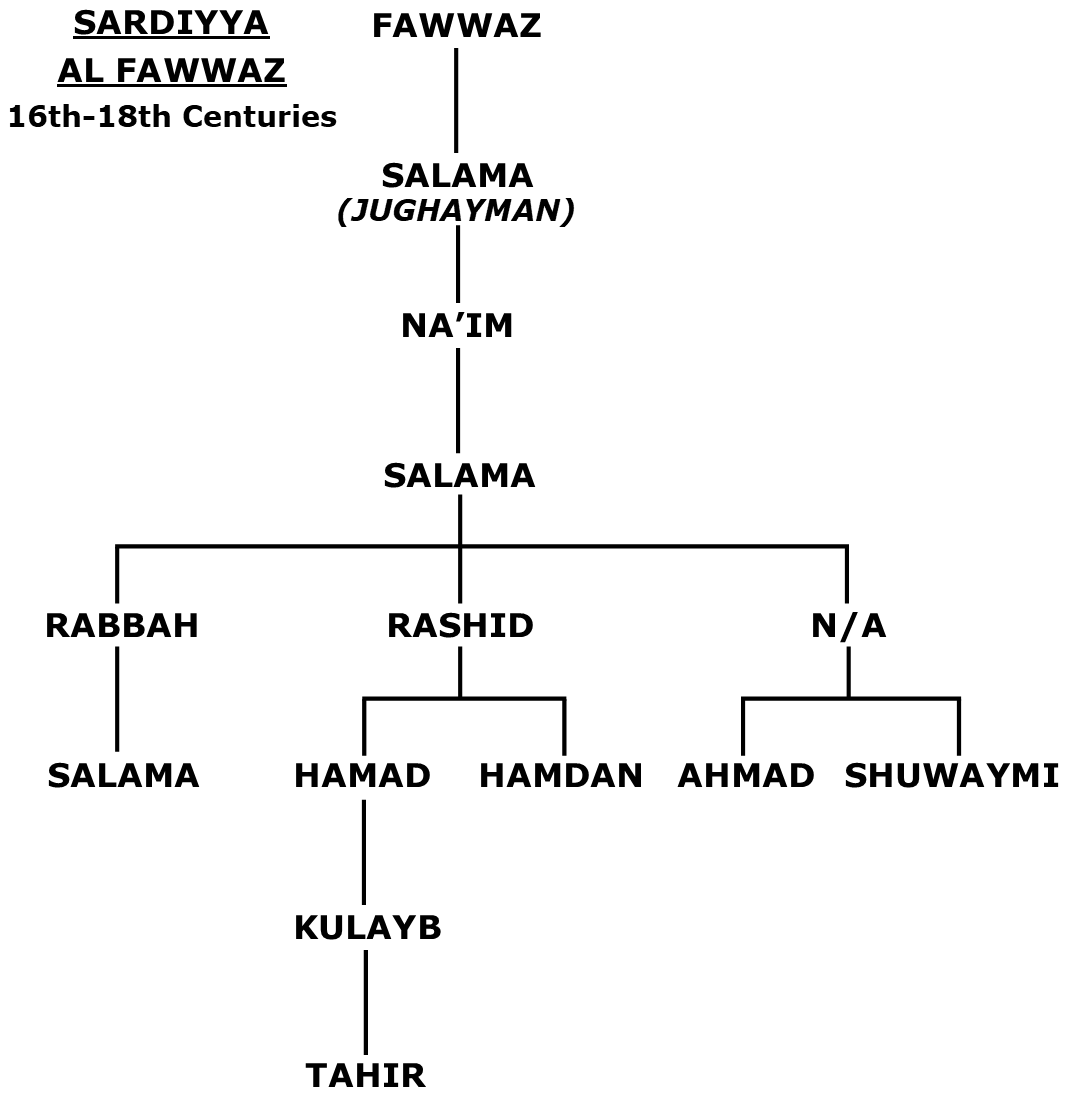
Family tree of the Al Fawwaz, the preeminent household of the Sardiyya, 16th–18th centuries

In 1516, the Ottoman Empire conquered Mamluk Syria and the new governor of Damascus, Janbirdi al-Ghazali, dispatched forces to arrest the Mafarija chief as a precaution to prevent their attack against the upcoming Hajj caravan. In 1519, the Sardiyya or more specifically their preeminent household, the Fawwaz, emerged in the historical record as a leading faction of the Mafarija under the emir Salama ibn Fawwaz, better known as 'Jughayman', who held the office of amir al-arab (commander of the Bedouin) of southern Syria in 1523. That year, Jughayman met with the amir al-hajj (commander of the [Syrian] Hajj caravan) at Zarqa and allowed them safe passage. Shortly after, he attacked the Egyptian Hajj caravan at al-Azlam with a large Bedouin force, but they were repulsed. Thereafter, Egyptian caravans were always accompanied by Ottoman troops and Jughayman was incentivized not to attack by an annual stipend of 1,000 dinars, which was inherited by his descendants. When the Syrian Hajj commander failed to pay Jughayman in 1524, he attacked the caravan but was repulsed. Jughayman constructed the Qal'at Mudawwara fort along the Hajj route and it became known for a time as 'Jughayman' after him. In 1530, a Mafarija chief, Mulhim, launched a serious assault against the caravan at Dhat Hajj and after being driven off, ruined the water sources at the Hajj waystations of Tabuk, Ukhaydir and al-Mu'azzam. He reengaged the caravan, but the pilgrims and their guards defeated him with heavy losses, many dying of thirst.

Between 1550 and 1574, the princely Fawwaz household of the Sardiyya–Mafarija vied with the Ghazzawi clan of Jabal Ajlun over control of the Hajj caravan routes. One of the chiefs of the Mafarija recorded during this period was Nasrallah, who in 1552 was deeemed a rebel by the Ottomans for selling illicit weapons. He was pardoned by the governor of Damascus after surrendering. The Ottomans later ordered the governor to arrest Nasrallah for arms possession in 1567, though it is not clear if this was carried out. Amid the rivalry with the Ghazzawis for primacy over the Hajj, Salama's son and successor, Na'im ibn Salama, staged a revolt against the Ottomans in 1557. The governor of Damascus's attempts to subdue him ended with heavy casualties for government troops and Na'im stymying the pilgrims' return to Damascus.

Na'im's son, Salama ibn Na'im, succeeded him as the other principal leader of the Mafarija. He sent a letter to the Ottoman sultan in 1570 affirming his administration over Salkhad and Jabal Hauran and requesting appointment as amir al-arab of southern Syria and the mashaykha (chieftainship) of the Hauran, pledging to protect the Hajj pilgrims, repair the Qatraneh cisterns and restore 31 ruined settlements in the Hauran. In March 1570, the head of the Ghazzawis, Qansuh ibn Musa'ida, was appointed to the lucrative office of amir al-hajj (commander of the Hajj caravan), which was opposed by Nasrallah and Salama. In response, the Ottomans appointed Salama's kinsman Uqab as amir al-hajj for 1571, relegating Qansuh with lesser authority. Uqab's appointment was opposed by the other Bedouin tribes, which feared the empowerment of the Sardiyya, and they rallied behind Qansuh against the Mafarija. As a result, the Ottomans canceled Uqab's appointment in favor of the neutral Ridwan Pasha. To compensate the Sardiyya, that same Ottoman order accorded Salama a timar (fief), the office of amir al-arab of southern Syria, and the mashaykha of the Hauran with directions to the governor of Damascus to reconcile Salama with Qansuh.

For the remainder of the 16th century, the Sardiyya rivaled another faction of the Mafarija for the lucrative offices of amir al-arab and amir al-hajj. In 1576, Qansuh, with assistance from the Ottoman district governors in Palestine, suppressed the Mafarija in southern Transjordan who had been rebelling against the state. Between 1586 and 1590, the Mafarija chief Amr ibn Jabr allied with Qansuh and defeated the Turkish governor of Ajlun, Abu Sayfayn, and then attacked Salama ibn Na'im, who was vying with Amr ibn Jabr for the mashaykha of the Hauran. The struggle continued between Amr ibn Jabr and Salama's son Rashid ibn Salama. In 1609, Rashid is mentioned assisting the Hajj pilgrims on their return from Mecca. Later that year, Rashid was defeated by Amr ibn Jabr, then officially recognized as leader of the Mafarija, prompting Rashid to seek assistance from the Al Hayar emirs of the Mawali tribe of central Syria and the local janissaries of Damascus. His emissaries, his nephews Ahmad and Shuwaymi, both died of the plague in the same year. Nevertheless, Rashid gained the backing of the Al Mira under its leader Nasir al-Din al-Fahili, and defeated Amr ibn Jabr in battle. (Note: The Al Mira were a branch of the Banu Rabi'a, a tribe of the Tayy which also included the Al Fadl, the parent tribe of the Al Hayar household of the Mawali.) The Mafarija internal rivalry became linked to the wider struggle between the Druze strongman Fakhr al-Din II and the Ottoman government in 1612–1615. Fakhr al-Din was an ally of Amr ibn Jabr and both supported Qansuh's grandson, the Ghazzawi chief and governor of Jabal Ajlun, Hamdan ibn Ahmad, against Farrukh Pasha, who was appointed by the Ottomans in Hamdan's place in 1612. Amr was also dismissed from the mashaykha of the Hauran and replaced with Rashid. With Fakhr al-Din's military backing, Hamdan and Amr defeated government forces and their allies, including Rashid, at Muzayrib on 21 April 1613, and Hamdan reoccupied Jabal Ajlun. Rashid and his ally, Hamdan's brother Bashir, attacked Hamdan in 1616 and he was accidentally killed by one of his guards.

By the mid-17th century, the office of amir al-arab in southern Syria transitioned to a new office, shaykh al-sham (chief of the Syrian Bedouin), which remained in the hands of the Sardiyya's leaders. This gave them the lucrative rights to protect the Hajj caravan. From the early 17th century, the Sardiyya additionally led the confederation of local Bedouin tribes called ahl al-shimal ('people of the North'), the 'North' loosely corresponding with that section of the Syrian desert between Damascus, al-Karak, the Jordan Valley and Wadi Sirhan, which encompassed the Hauran, Jabal Ajlun, and Balqa. (Note: According to the oral traditions of the regional Bedouin, the Sardiyya gained this preeminence in the alliance after overcoming the Sirhan tribe, who hitherto were the dominant tribe of the Hauran. The Sirhan afterward migrated to the Wadi Sirhan but eventually rejoined the ahl al-shimal confederation.) The earliest known register mentioning Hajj-related budget allocations from the treasury of Damascus to the Sardiyya and other tribes dates to 1672. It shows the allocations to the Mafarija-Sardiyya sheikhs Salama ibn Rabbah and Hamdan ibn Rashid significantly higher than those to the sheikhs of the Bani Sakhr, who arrived in the region around the 17th century. To wrest control of these lucrative rights from the Sardiyya, the Sakhr frequently attacked the caravans to provoke the Sardiyya, and by the end of the 17th century or early 18th century, the Sakhr increasingly gained such rights to the detriment of the Sardiyya.

=== Decline ===
By 1703, the allocations to the Sakhr had expoentially increased. In 1714, the chief of the Sardiyya, Kulayb ibn Hamad ibn Rashid Ibn Fawwaz, who held the posts of shaykh al-Sham and shaykh al-bilad al-Hawraniyya (chief of the Hauran), was killed in a campaign against the Bedouin by the governor of Damascus, Nasuh Pasha. His elimination undermined the power of the Sardiyya to the benefit of rival tribes; it represented a turning point in the fortunes of the Sardiyya, heralding a decline from which they did not recover. Kulayb's son, Tahir ibn Kulayb (or Dahir ibn Kulayb), was less powerful than his father and his authority was challenged by other Bedouin tribes in the region. In the 1718 allocations register, the chief of the Sardiyya still held the office of shaykh al-Sham. At some point, Ibn Kulayb was dismissed from his position as chief of the local Bedouin by the governor of Damascus. In the early 1730s, Daher al-Umar, a powerful multazim (tax farmer) in northern Palestine (whose mother hailed from the Sardiyya), hosted the Sardiyya sheikh Qa'dan ibn Tahir in his Tiberias headquarters after he was dismissed as shaykh al-Sham and expelled from Damascus. In 1737–1738, Ibn Kulayb (unclear if Tahir or his son Qa'dan) allied with Daher, and together they stormed the home of Ibn Kulayb's replacement in Damascus, the sheikh Dayabi and resumed leadership of the tribes. However, once Daher withdrew from Damascus, Dayabi ousted Ibn Kulayb.

In a 1742 register, two sheikhs of the Sardiyya, Husayn al-Miryan and Khalil Khunayfis, are mentioned receiving payment for transporting provisions for the Hajj caravan from Muzayrib to Qatrana. In 1771, the Sardiyya aided the governor of Damascus, Uthman Pasha al-Kurji, against Daher al-Umar's campaign against him, escorting him through alternative routes in the Hauran while he was leading the Hajj pilgrim caravan to Mecca. In the 1772 and 1779 registers, the Sardiyya are no longer shown to be holding the office of shaykh al-Sham and by 1803, the office itself had been dissolved, a reflection that its influence had waned around the same time as that of the Sardiyya. The Sardiyya continued to graze their flocks east of the River Jordan into the late 18th century and, for some time afterward, were additionally active in the Jezreel Valley (Marj Ibn Amer).

The Swiss geographer Johann Ludwig Burckhardt who traveled through Syria in 1812 described the Sardiyya at that time being divided into two sections, the Dhaher and the Waked, each section headed by two sheikhs. Altogether the tribe had about 150 horsemen with "an excellent breed of mares", supplying one annually to the governor of Damascus in return for weapons and robes to one of the sheikhs. The awarded sheikh was styled shaykh al-Hawran and was obligated to back the governor against encroachments into the Hauran by hostile tribes. Nevertheless, the Sardiyya, like their counterparts the Fuhayl (or Feheily), were in frequent conflict with the authorities in Damascus. Both the Sardiyya and the Fuhayl received annual tribute from the villagers of the Hauran. Remarking on Burckhardt's observations, the modern historian Dick Douwes notes this relationship between the Sardiyya and the Damascus government was a vestige of the old system and that by this point the Sardiyya had little capacity to enforce their security and tax collection mandates. In 1838, the scholar Eli Smith confirmed the Sardiyya's leaders continued to be referred to as 'sheikhs of the Arabs of Hauran' and constituted one of the 'four noble tribes' of the Hauran. Subject to their authority were the tribes of Sharafat, Bani Adam, Samarat, al-Ghawanim and al-Asafir. In 1860, the tribe joined with the Druze in their assault on Zahle during the 1860 civil war and carted off horses from the town; they referred to these horses and their offspring as Zahalni after Zahle.

== 20th century ==
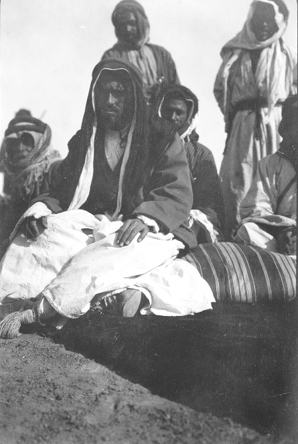
Sheikh of the Sardiyya, Ghalib ibn Mut'ab of the Sardiyya's leading Fawwaz household, 1913

In the late 19th or early 20th century, the Sardiyya's leading sheikh, Mit'ab al-Kanj, was reputed for his strength and established the tribe's position in the Hamad, the basaltic country east of Jabal al-Druze. Mit'ab's son and successor, Ghalib ibn Mit'ab, was reported by British intelligence to be not as militant, ambitious or intelligent as his father. In 1911, amid the Hauran Druze Rebellion, Ghalib gained the backing of the Ottoman commander Sami Pasha against the Sardiyya's longtime Bedouin enemies, the Ruwallah tribe. Ghalib was considered by the Arab nationalist politicians of Damascus as an ally. In 1916, under Ghalib's leadership, they counted 150 encampments (households), 40 horsemen and 250 men under arms.

During the Emirate period in Transjordan (1921–1948), the Sardiyya were largely based in Syria but crossed into Transjordan during the summer and often clashed with tribes there over water and grazing for their livestock. Part of the tribe settled in northern Transjordan, east of the Hejaz Railway line beginning in 1939 and throughout in the 1940s after the government granted them lands there to encourage settlement and cultivation; thereafter they became citizens of the Emirate, which became the Kingdom of Jordan in 1948. The leader of the tribe in the 1930s was Ghalib's son and successor Saud al-Kulayb. His son, Kulayb Saud Al Fawwaz, became a Jordanian senator (2003–2005) and cabinet minister (2011–2012) and authored a book about the history of the Sardiyya tribe, posthumously published in 2018.

== See also ==
- Banu Saqr, related tribe

== Sources ==
- Abu-Husayn, Abdul-Rahim (1985). Provincial Leaderships in Syria, 1575–1650. Beirut: American University of Beirut. ISBN 9780815660729.
- Admiralty War Staff–Intelligence Division (1916). A Handbook of Arabia, Volume 1. Admiralty War Staff-Intelligence Division.
- Al Mubaidin, Mohannad (July 2018). "Review of The Emirs of Houran: The Al Fawwaz as the Sheikhs of the Sardiya". Ostour. 4 (8).
- Alon, Yoav (2007). The Making of Jordan: Tribes, Colonialism and the Modern State. London and New York: I. B. Tauris. ISBN 978-1-84511-138-0.
- Ayalon, David (1994). Islam and the Abode of War: Military Slaves and Islamic Adversaries. Brookfield, Vermont: Ashgate Publishing. ISBN 0-86078-430-4.
- Bakhit, Muhammad Adnan Salamah (1972). The Ottoman Province of Damascus in the Sixteenth Century (PhD).
- Barakat, Nora Elizabeth (2023). Bedouin Bureaucrats: Mobility and Property in the Ottoman Empire (paperback ed.). Stanford: Stanford University Press. ISBN 9781503635623.
- Barbir, Karl K. (1980). Ottoman Rule in Damascus, 1708–1758. Princeton University Press. ISBN 9781400853205.
- Blackburn, Richard (2005). Journey to the Sublime Porte The Arabic Memoir of a Sharifian Agent's Diplomatic Mission to the Ottoman Imperial Court in the Era of Suleyman the Magnificent; the Relevant Text from Quṭb Al-Dīn Al-Nahrawālī's Al-Fawāʼid Al-sanīyah Fī Al-riḥlah Al-Madanīyah Wa Al-Rūmīyah. Orient-Institut. ISBN 3-89913-441-9.
- Burckhardt, John Lewis (1831). Notes on the Bedouins and Wahábys, Vol 1. London: Henry Colburn and Richard Bentley.
- Canaan, Tawfiq (1936). "The Ṣaqr Bedouin of Bîsān". Journal of the Palestine Oriental Society. 16: 21–32.
- Cohen, Amnon (1973). Palestine in the 18th Century: Patterns of Government and Administration. Jerusalem: The Magnes Press. ISBN 978-0-19-647903-3.
- Douwes, Dick (2000). The Ottomans in Syria: A History of Justice and Oppression. I. B. Tauris. ISBN 1860640311.
- Fawaz, Leila Tarazi (1994). An Occasion for War: Civil Conflict in Lebanon and Damascus in 1860. University of California Press. ISBN 9780520087828.
- Hiyari, Mustafa A. (1975). "The Origins and Development of the Amīrate of the Arabs during the Seventh/Thirteenth and Eighth/Fourteenth Centuries". Bulletin of the School of Oriental and African Studies. 38 (3): 509–524. doi:10.1017/s0041977x00048060. JSTOR 613705.
- Milwright, Marcus (2008). The Fortress of the Raven: Karak in the Middle Islamic Period (1100–1650). Leiden: Brill. ISBN 978-90-04-16519-9.
- Peake, Frederick Gerard (1934). A History of Trans-Jordan and its Tribes, Vol. 2. Amman.
- Petry, Carl F. (1994). Protectors or Praetorians?: The Last Mamluk Sultans and Egypt's Waning as a Great Power. Albany: State University of New York. ISBN 0-7914-2139-2.
- Rafeq, Abdul Karim (1966). The Province of Damascus, 1723–1783. Beirut: Khayats.
- Robinson, E.; Smith, E. (1841). Biblical Researches in Palestine, Mount Sinai and Arabia Petraea: A Journal of Travels in the year 1838. Vol. 3. Boston: Crocker & Brewster.
- Shoshan, Boaz (2020). Damascus Life 1480–1500: A Report of a Local Notary. Leiden and Boston: Brill. ISBN 978-90-04-41325-2.
- van der Steen, Eveline (2013). Near Eastern Tribal Societies During the Nineteenth Century. Taylor and Francis. ISBN 9781317543473.
