= Bajir =

Religious deity in pre Islamic Arabia

Bajir (alternatively Bajar or Bahar) was a minor deity worshiped by the pre-Islamic Arabian tribe Azd. In addition to the Azd, there is also indication that other neighbouring tribes such as Tayy and al-Qudaa might have revered the deity.

Mazin bin Gadhuba al-Tayy, a native of Oman, was said to have been the last custodian of Bajir. During a sacrifice, Mazin is said to have heard a voice asking him to give up his faith in Bajir and convert to Islam. Mazin is said to have destroyed the image of Bajir and dedicated the rest of his life to spreading Islam in the region.
