= Hazim ibn Ali =

Hazim ibn Ali ibn Mufarrij ibn Daghfal ibn al-Jarrah al-Ta'i (Arabic: حازم بن علي بن مفرج بن دغفل الجراح الطائي) (ALA-LC: Ḥǎzim ibn ʿAlī ibn Mufarrij ibn Daghfal ibn al-Jarrāh at-Ṭaʾī) was a chieftain of the Jarrahids, a Bedouin clan of the Banu Tayy tribe that intermittently controlled Palestine, Balqa and northern Arabia in the late 10th and early 11th century. The dynasty remained influential in the northern Arabian Desert in later centuries. Hazim was the son of Ali ibn Mufarrij, and grandson of Mufarrij ibn Daghfal, a former governor of Palestine under the Fatimid Caliphate. There is scant information about Hazim in medieval sources.

Hazim participated in the Alid attempt to capture Damascus from the Fatimid army of Badr al-Jamali in 1065/66. The Alids, led by the Sharif of Mecca, Ibn Abi'l Jann, were defeated, and Hazim and his cousin Humayd ibn Mahmud were captured by the Fatimids and imprisoned in Cairo. They were released in 1066/67 upon the intercession of the Fatimid general, Nasir al-Dawla ibn Hamdan, with the Fatimid caliph, al-Mustansir. Hazim had at least two sons, Badr and Rabi'ah. The latter was the ancestor of the Banu Rabi'ah, a minor line of the Jarrahids that spawned the Al Fadl dynasty, which came to dominate the Bedouin of the Syrian Desert until the 18th century.
