= Al-Maghribī =

Al-Maghribī (meaning "from Maghreb") can refer to the following persons:

- Ibn Yaḥyā al-Maghribī al-Samawʾal, mathematician and astronomer of the 12th century
- Muḥyi al-Dīn al-Maghribī (1220-1283), Arab astronomer
- Mahmud Sulayman al-Maghribi, former prime minister of Libya
- Yusuf al-Maghribi, 17th-century lexicographer active in Cairo
- Ibn Said al-Maghribi, geographer, historian and the most important collector of poetry from al-Andalus in the 12th and 13th centuries
- Abu'l-Hasan Ali ibn Muhammad al-Maghribi, government official in the Abbasid Caliphate
