= Zayd al-Khayr =

Companion of the Islamic prophet Muhammad

- زيد الخير
- Born: c. 6th century CE; Najd, now part of Saudi Arabia
- Died: c. 631–632 CE; Between Medina and Najd
- Known for: Being one of Muhammad's companions

Zayd al-Khayr (Arabic: زيد الخير), formerly Zayd al-Khayl was a tribal chief of the Tayy tribe who converted to Islam and became one of the Sahaba.

== Biography ==
Zayd al-Khayr was originally Zayd al-Khayl ibn Muhalhil. He was from the Tayy tribe that lived in Najd at the time. His former epithet "al-Khayl" referred to the numerous horses he owned, while his new epithet "al-Khayr" referred to the blessings of God upon him for his conversion to Islam. Zayd had two sons, Mikhnaf and Harith, who were Muslims.

== Delegation to Medina ==
In 631–632 CE (10 AH in the Hijri calendar), Zayd al-Khayl as the chief of the Tayy led a delegation to Medina to meet Muhammad and enquire about Islam, which was rising at the time. Muhammad was reportedly impressed by Zayd's qualities and changed his name to Zayd al-Khayr after he and the members of the delegation has converted to Islam. However, one of the members of said delegation, Zurr ibn Sadous, refused to convert to Islam and then fled to Byzantine Syria where he converted to Christianity.

He was the last follower of the god Bajir. It was said that when doing a sacrifice, he heard a voice telling him to stop worshiping Bajir and convert to Islam. He destroyed the image of Bajir and dedicated the rest of his life to spreading Islam.

=== Death ===
As Zayd was returning to Najd from Medina, he fell ill with fever. Zayd eventually succumbed to his illness and died while he was stationed at a river outside Najd. After his death was known to his tribe, Zayd's wife, still a pagan, retrieved the Islamic scriptures that were present with him and then burned them.

== See also ==
- List of Sahaba
