= Klaib Al-Fawwaz =

Jordanian diplomat (1950–2017)

Klaib Saud Al-Fawwaz (Arabic: كليب الفواز; 15 October 1950 – 8 January 2017) was a Jordanian diplomat, senator, State Minister for Cabinet Affairs and Secretary General of the Eslah Political Party.

== Early life and education ==
Al-Fawwaz was born in Sabha, Jordan in 1950. His father was Saud Ghaleb Al-Fawwaz, sheikh of the Serdiyeh tribe. When visiting the region in 1913–1914, English traveller and explorer Gertrude Bell visited the Serdiyeh tribe and documented her visit in letters and photographs, which included a photograph of Klaib's grandfather Ghaleb.

Al-Fawwaz received his university education at the University of Jordan, where he attained a bachelor's degree in political science. He also received a master's degree in public relations from the Fairleigh Dickinson University in New Jersey in 1977 and a PhD in modern and contemporary history from the Arab History Institute in Baghdad, Iraq in 1995.

== Career ==
Al-Fawwaz served in Jordan's diplomatic missions around the world for over three decades. He worked at the Jordanian embassy in New Delhi (1979–1983), the Permanent Mission of Jordan to the United Nations in New York (1984–1988) and the embassies in Baghdad (1991–1995) and Uzbekistan (1997–1999). Al-Fawwaz also served as Jordan's Consul General to Dubai and Northern Emirates (1999–2003), after which he became a senator (2003–2005).

From 1995 to 1996, Al-Fawwaz was a negotiating member of the Quartet for the displaced in the Peace Negotiations (عضو مفاوض في اللجنة الرباعية للنازحين في مفاوضات السلام) and a member of the Multilateral Peace Negotiations committee for the refugees in the Peace Negotiations (عضو في لجنة المفاوضات المتعددة الأطراف للاجئين في مفاوضات السلام).

From 2011 to 2012, Al-Fawwaz served as Jordan's State Minister for Cabinet Affairs with former Prime Minister Awn Shawkat Al-Khasawneh.

Al-Fawwaz was the founder and Secretary General of the Eslah Political Party from June 2012- January 2017.

== Publications ==
Al-Fawwaz is the author of the Princes of Hauran - Al-Fawwaz Sheikhs of the Serdiyeh Clan (أمراء حوران آل الفواز مشايخ السردية) and has written numerous articles and essays.

== Personal life ==
Al-Fawwaz was married to Mrs. Intissar Al-Armouti, the daughter of the late Mohammad Nazzal Armouti. They have four children: Zein, Hala, Nasser and Anoud.

He died on 8 January 2017.

== Awards ==
Al-Fawwaz was awarded the Excellence in Economic Performance Award (جائزة التميز في الأداء الإقتصادي) at the Second Jordanian Ambassador's Convention in Jordan in 2003.

== Memorial ==
A memorial night was organized on 15/4/2017 in memory of Dr. Al-Fawwaz with a number of his close friends giving speeches on the occasion, including Mr. Awn Shawkat Al-Khasawneh.
