= Jarrahids =

Arab dynasty

Banu al-Jarrah
- Bedouin Princely Clan
- Parent house: Banu Tayy
- Country: Fatimid Caliphate; Byzantine Empire
- Founded: 970s CE
- Founder: Daghfal ibn al-Jarrah (circa 971)
- Final ruler: Fadl ibn Rabi'ah (circa 1107)
- Estates: Ramla; Bayt Jibrin; Nablus; Balqa; Jibal al-Sharat; Jabal Tayy
- Dissolution: Mid-11th/Early 12th centuries
- Cadet branches: Al Fadl; Al Mira

The Jarrahids (Arabic: بنو الجرَّاح, romanized: Banū al-Jarrāḥ) were an Arab dynasty that intermittently ruled Palestine and controlled Transjordan and northern Arabia in the late 10th and early 11th centuries. They were the ruling family of the Tayy tribe, one of the three powerful tribes of Syria at the time; the other two were Kalb and Kilab.

The Jarrahids first emerged in the Muslim sources as allies of the Qarmatians, and grew prominent under their chieftain Mufarrij ibn Daghfal ibn al-Jarrah. In 973, the latter secured the governorship of Palestine, with Ramla at its center, from the Fatimid Caliphate in reward for military services. Mufarrij lost favor with the Fatimids, who drove the Jarrahids out of Palestine when they plundered Ramla in 981. Afterward, the Jarrahids raided Mecca-bound Hajj pilgrim caravans and vacillated between the Fatimids, Byzantines and individual Muslim rulers in Syria. By 1011–12, the Jarrahids controlled all of interior Palestine up to Tiberias and defied the Fatimids by declaring their own caliph, al-Hasan ibn Ja'far, at Ramla. The Fatimid caliph al-Hakim then paid Mufarrij to end the rebellion, but not long after dispatched an expedition against the Jarrahids in which they were driven from Palestine.

Mufarrij died in 1013 and was succeeded by his son Hassan, who regained control of Palestine. He entered the Tayy into an alliance with Kalb and Kilab, which dominated Syria until its defeat by the Fatimids in 1029. As a result, the Jarrahids moved their encampments close to their Byzantine allies near Antioch. They fought alongside the Byzantines in several confrontations with regional Muslim powers. After 1041, there were only scattered mentions of the Jarrahids, namely regarding Hassan's nephews, Hazim ibn Ali and Humayd ibn Mahmud in the 1060s, and Hazim's grandson, Fadl ibn Rabi'ah, who at times was an ally of the Fatimids, Crusaders, Mazyadids or the Seljuks. He became the progenitor of the Al Fadl dynasty whose emirs came to dominate the Bedouin of the steppe until the 18th century.

== Territory ==
The Jarrahids intermittently held territory in Palestine, the Balqa plain east of the Jordan River, the Sharat mountains southeast of the Jordan, and the north Arabian mountain ranges of Jabal Aja and Jabal Salma. Their presence in Palestine was intermittent; they controlled the region in 977–981/82, 1011–1013, 1024–1029, and circa 1041. During a period of conflict with the Fatimids, the Jarrahids had relocated to the vicinity of Palmyra in 1030 and in 1031 relocated their encampments to al-Ruj, an area between Antioch and Homs.

== History ==
=== Beginnings ===
The Jarrahids (Banu al-Jarrah) were the ruling clan of the Tayy tribe. The Jarrahids initially controlled fortresses in the Sharat mountains. The first member of the Banu al-Jarrah to be mentioned in the historical record was Daghfal ibn al-Jarrah, an ally of the Qarmatians. He was based in al-Ramla, the center of Jund Filastin (District of Palestine). Daghfal provided safe haven for an officer of the Qarmatian ruler, Abu Tahir al-Jannabi, when the latter departed to lead an expedition against Fatimid Egypt in 972 CE. Two years later, a certain Hassan ibn al-Jarrah (possibly the same person as Daghfal) was a commander of auxiliaries in the Qarmatian army during a second invasion of Egypt. Hassan accepted a bribe to defect by the Fatimid caliph al-Mu'izz, and his defection resulted in the rout of the Qarmatian force at the outskirts of Cairo and the subsequent Fatimid reoccupation of Palestine and Syria as far as Damascus.

=== Reign of Muffarij ===
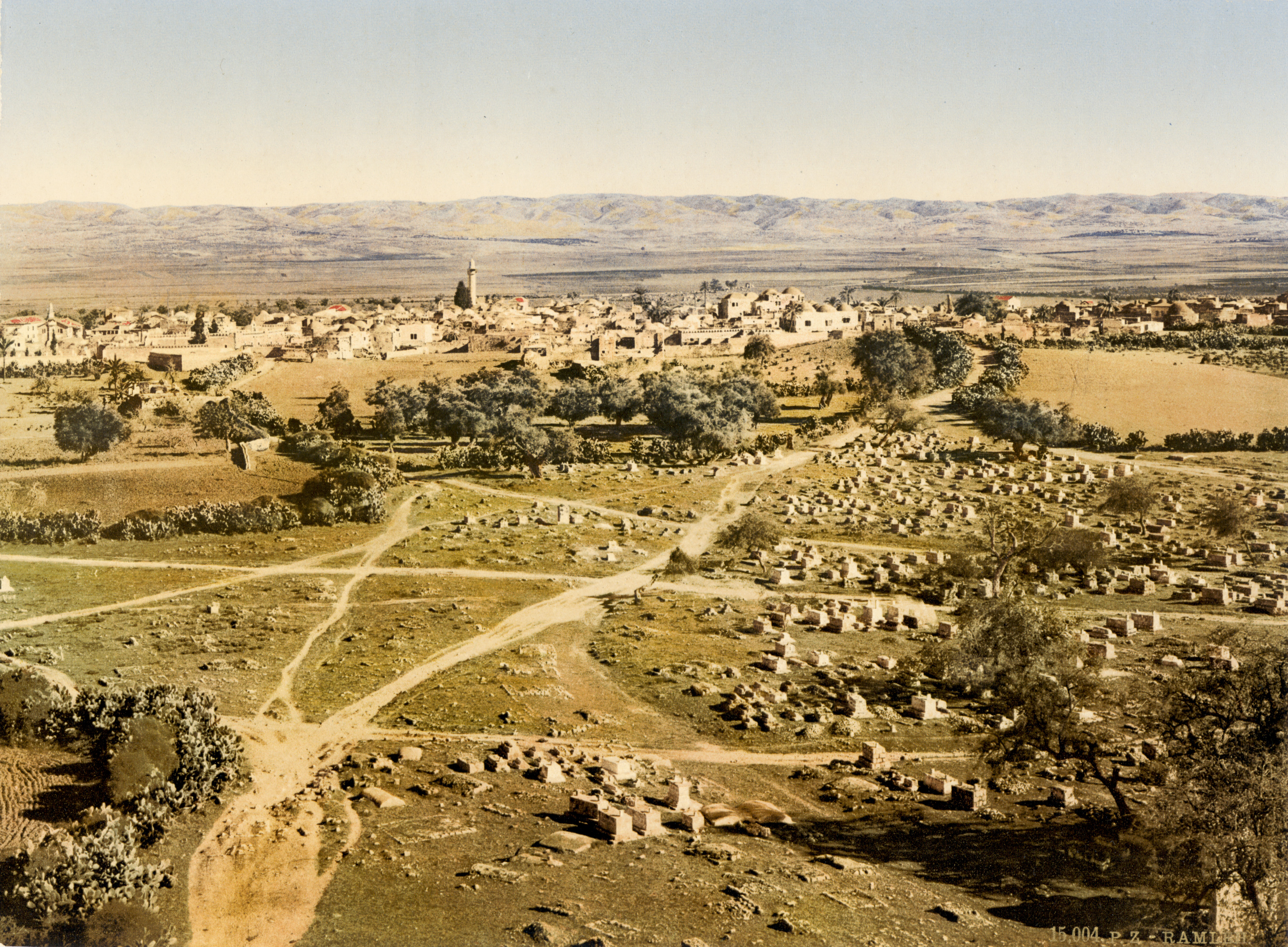
The town of Ramla and its surroundings in 1895. The Jarrahids under Mufarrij ibn Daghfal and his son Hassan intermittently governed, controlled or plundered Ramla in the late 10th and early 11th centuries

Daghfal's son, Mufarrij, entered the historical record during the Fatimid struggle with Alptakin, a Qarmatian-backed Buyid commander who took over Damascus. Alptakin was defeated at the Battle of Ramla in 977, and Mufarrij captured him between Kafr Saba and Qalansawa to collect the 100,000 gold dinar-bounty placed on his head by the Fatimid caliph al-Aziz. The Jarrahids detained Alptakin either at Yubna or Tell es-Safi in southern Palestine before transferring him to the Fatimids. In return for the Jarrahids' support, al-Aziz made Mufarrij wālī (governor) of Ramla.

In 979, the Fatimid general Fadl ibn Salih offered the Hamdanid emir Abu Taghlib control of Ramla in place of the Jarrahids; by doing this, Fadl sought to stifle a brewing alliance between the main regional Arab powers at the time, the Jarrahids, Hamdanids and Uqaylids. Abu Taghlib and his Uqaylid allies attacked Ramla in August, but were defeated and captured on 29 August by the Jarrahids, who by then regained Fadl's support. The latter requested Mufarrij hand over Abu Taghlib to Caliph al-Aziz, but fearing Abu Taghlib could be potentially used by the Fatimids against him, Mufarrij killed him and sent his head to the caliph instead. Mufarrij's execution of Abu Taghlib spelled the official end of the Hamdanids of Mosul.

Fadl soon after turned against Mufarrij, but was recalled to Cairo by Caliph al-Aziz, essentially leaving the Jarrahids as the virtual rulers of Palestine. Between 979 and 980, the Jarrahids plundered and laid waste to al-Ramla and the countryside of Palestine, prompting a Fatimid expedition against them in 981. That year, the Jarrahids revolted against the Fatimids while their army was besieging Damascus. The Jarrahids were joined by the remnants of Abu Taghlib's army and the Arab governor of Tiberias, a certain Bishara. The Jarrahids were ultimately driven out of Palestine that year by the Fatimids and fled toward the Hejaz. In June 982, they plundered the Hajj pilgrim caravan on its return to Syria from Mecca. Another Fatimid punitive expedition was launched against them, but was routed by the Jarrahids at Ayla. Afterward, Mufarrij returned to Palestine, only to be defeated again by the Fatimids. This time, Mufarrij fled north toward Homs where he was given safe haven by the Hamdanids' Circassian governor, Bakjur, in late 982. During the next ten years, Mufarrij vacillated between the Byzantines, Bakjur and the Fatimids. By 997, the Jarrahids had attempted to sack Ramla, but were forced back and fled to the Jabal Aja and Salma mountains in northern Arabia, the ancestral territory of the Tayy.

In later years, Mufarrij had his sons Ali, Hassan and Mahmud, aid the Fatimid caliph al-Hakim in his military campaigns. According to historian Marius Canard, "an opportunity occurred for Mufarrij to play a part of genuine political significance" in 1012 when the disgraced Fatimid vizier, Abu'l Qasim al-Husayn, took refuge with Mufarrij's son Hassan. Historian Hugh Kennedy asserts that this represented the "high point in the fortunes of the Jarrahid leaders". At that point, the Jarrahids controlled the entire interior of Palestine from the boundary with Egypt up to Tiberias. Under Hassan and Abu'l Qasim's initiative, the Jarrahids attacked and captured Yarukh, al-Hakim's appointee to the governorship of Damascus, in the vicinity of Gaza while he was on his way to Damascus. They concurrently occupied Ramla, and soon after Hassan had Yarukh killed. They further challenged al-Hakim's authority by proclaiming al-Hasan ibn Ja'far, the Sharif of Mecca, as caliph in Ramla. Al-Hakim bribed the Jarrahids to end their revolt, and afterward al-Hasan returned to Mecca, while Abu'l Qasim fled to Iraq. The Jarrahids continued to dominate Palestine and sought to entrench their rule by appealing for support among the local Christians. To that end, Mufarrij contributed to the restoration of the Church of the Holy Sepulchre, which al-Hakim destroyed in prior years.

=== Reign of Hassan ===
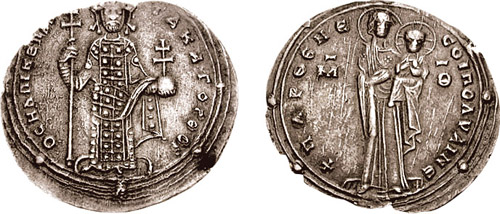
Emperor Romanus III (depicted on coin) of the Byzantine Empire persuaded the Jarrahids to relocate their encampments close to his territory in Antioch, where they served as allies of the Byzantines in their campaigns against regional Muslim states.

Al-Hakim switched his approach to the Jarrahids from diplomacy to punitive military force in August 1013. Ali and Mahmud surrendered to the advancing Fatimid army, while al-Hakim had Mufarrij poisoned to death. Hassan, whose ambition was to rule Palestine, fled but later gained a pardon from al-Hakim, who restored to him Mufarrij's iqtaʿat in Palestine. Afterward, Hassan assisted al-Hakim in his expeditions against Aleppo.

In 1019, Hassan, as a representative of the Tayy, entered his tribe into an alliance with the Kalb under Sinan ibn Ulayyan and the Kilab under Salih ibn Mirdas. Such an alliance between the three principal Arab tribes of the Levant was unprecedented and was meant to prevent outsider dominance of the Syrian desert and steppe. According to the pact's terms, the Jarrahids would rule Palestine, while the Kalb and Kilab (under the Mirdasids) would rule Damascus and Aleppo, respectively. Al-Hakim's reign ended with his mysterious death in 1021 and he was succeeded by Caliph Ali az-Zahir.

In 1023, the Fatimids installed Anushtakin al-Dizbari as the military governor of Palestine, which the Jarrahids opposed. In 1024, one of Hassan's sons and another Bedouin chieftain sacked Ayla and al-Arish, which the Fatimid central government was unable to respond to. Instead, Anushtakin took the initiative to extract taxes from Hassan's iqtaʿ at Bayt Jibrin and deprive him of the revenues, which ended with the killing of Anushtakin's soldiers. This escalated the conflict with the Jarrahids, particularly after Anushtakin imprisoned two of Hassan's chief aides in Ascalon. The Jarrahids launched an all out war in September to release their men, destroying Tiberias, besieging Ramla and freeing their men by forging release authorization documents. They forced al-Dizbari to flee Ramla, which they plundered, and gained a Fatimid concession to grant Nablus as an iqtaʿ, but not Jerusalem.

The Tayy, Kalb and Kilab renewed their alliance in 1024/25, but their appeal for support from the Byzantines was rebuffed by Emperor Basil II. Nonetheless, they overcame a Fatimid army dispatched by az-Zahir that year at Ascalon and Hassan entered Ramla. After Sinan's death, his nephew and successor defected to the Fatimids, while the Jarrahids and Mirdasids continued their rebellion. They were defeated in the Battle of al-Uqhuwana near Lake Tiberias by the Fatimids under general al-Dizbari in 1029, after which Hassan fled Palestine. The Fatimids consequently transferred the Jarrahids' iqtaʿat in Palestine to more friendly Arab tribes.

The Jarrahids and the Byzantines struck an alliance in 1030. Hassan's envoys were received by the Byzantines in Antioch and given a cross-adorned flag to represent Hassan and a message promising them the restoration of Palestine to their tribe. The tribe also nominally embraced Christianity as part of the Jarrahid agreement with the Byzantines. A Jarrahid-Byzantine coalition was soon after defeated by the Mirdasids. Hassan rekindled his former alliance with the Kalb and together their tribesmen attacked the Fatimids in Hawran until being driven to Palmyra in the desert. Afterward, Emperor Romanus III persuaded Hassan and the Tayy to relocate their encampments to Byzantine territory near Antioch and the 20,000-strong Tayy migrated to al-Ruj in northwestern Syria. There, they faced down two Fatimid assaults at Qastun and Inab. The Jarrahids later raided Afamiya on behalf of the Byzantines and assisted the latter with capturing the fortress of al-Maniqa in the Jabal Ansariya range.

The Byzantines and Fatimids entered into peace negotiations in 1032 and Hassan was present in the discussions in Constantinople. The Byzantines stipulated the restoration of Jarrahid governorship in Palestine under Fatimid suzerainty as a condition for peace, but az-Zahir refused. The Fatimids' rejection of this condition contributed to the collapse of the peace talks. The following year, the Jarrahids offered their loyalty to al-Dizbari in exchange for their former iqtaʿat in Palestine, but the attempt failed. The Fatimids and Byzantines ultimately concluded a ten-year peace treaty, without consideration of the Jarrahids' interests, in 1035. Afterward, Hassan and his son Allaf are mentioned on occasion, such as their assistance in the Byzantine defense of Edessa from the Marwanids and Numayrids in 1035/36. In 1038, the Jarrahids participated in al-Dizbari's conquest of Mirdasid-held Aleppo. As a result, Hassan was forced into confinement in Constantinople until 1040 as a means to prevent his tribe, with its unstable allegiances, from potentially attacking Antioch. The last mention of Hassan is in 1041, by which point the Jarrahids had been permitted by the Fatimids to re-enter Palestine. Hassan's rule at the time was opposed by the Fatimid governor of Damascus.

=== Later emirs ===
The Jarrahids were mentioned in the sources in 1065/66, when Hassan's nephews Hazim ibn Ali and Humayd ibn Mahmud likely backed Abd al-Sharif ibn Abi'l Jann in his attempt to wrest control of Damascus from the troops of Fatimid vizier Badr al-Jamali. Afterward, the nephews were captured and jailed in Cairo. Their release was requested by the Fatimid general and descendant of the Hamdanids, Nasir al-Dawla ibn Hamdan, in 1066/67. Hazim had sons named Badr and Rabi'a. According to Syrian historian Mustafa A. Hiyari, information on Rabi'a in the medieval sources is confused, though he most likely was an emir of Bedouin auxiliaries for the Burid ruler of Damascus, Toghtekin (r. 1103–1128). Nothing more about him is mentioned in the sources, but the military activities of his sons, Mira and Fadl, are noted. His other sons were Daghfal, Thabit and Faraj.

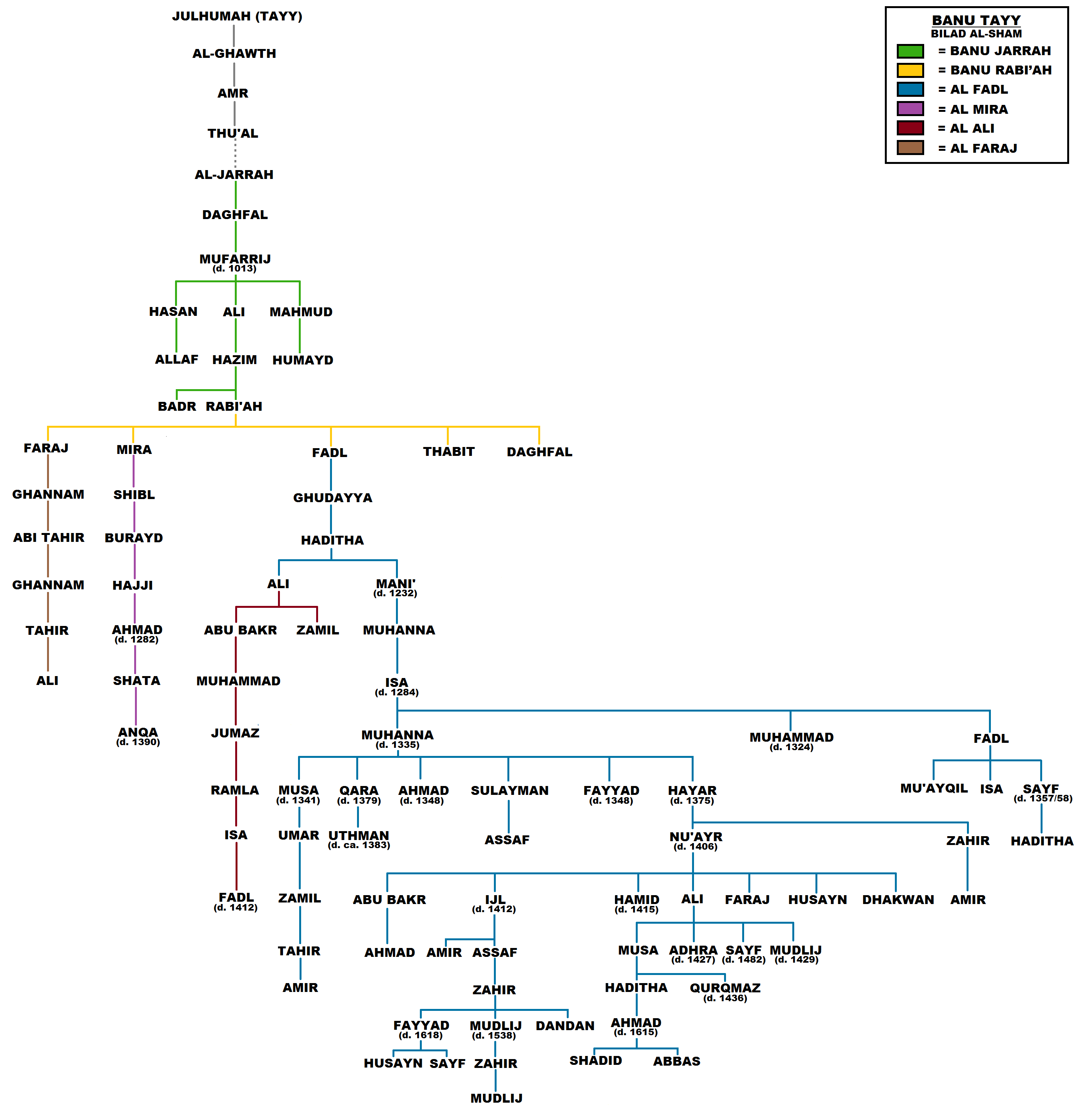
Genealogy of the Jarrahids and their descendants

Fadl is described in the 13th-century chronicle of Ibn al-Athir (d. 1233) as an emir, who, in 1107/08, vacillated between the Crusaders, who conquered the Levantine coast in 1099, and the Fatimids, whose rule had been limited to Egypt since 1071. This prompted Toghtekin to expel Fadl from Syria, after which he formed an alliance with Sadaqa ibn Mansur, the chieftain of the Arab Mazyadid dynasty in Iraq, before defecting to the Seljuks. According to Ibn al-Athir, Fadl's entry into Anbar to block the desert route to Sadaqa "was the last that was heard of him".

The Jarrahids were described by historian Marius Canard (1888–1982) as a "turbulent family who were not without significance as pawns on the chess-board of Syria in the 10th–11th centuries, whom the Fatimids alternately attacked and wooed, whom the Byzantines succeeded in using, but who seem to have created for themselves, in their own best interests, a rule of duplicity, treason and pillage".

== Descendants ==
Fadl ibn Rabi'a was the progenitor of the Al Fadl clan, while Mira and Faraj became the ancestors of the Al Mira and Al Faraj clans, respectively. Collectively, these clans formed the Banu Rabi'a, and together with their allies, they dominated the desert and steppe regions between the Euphrates valley in the north to the central Najd and northern Hejaz in the south. During Ayyubid rule in Syria (1182–1260), the emirs of Al Fadl and Al Faraj alternated as umara al-'ʿarab ("commanders of the Bedouin tribes"; sing. amir al-ʿarab). However, under the Mamluks (1260–1516), the post became hereditary within the house of Al Fadl, who had authority over the Bedouin of northern Syria and held numerous iqtaʿat, including Palmyra, Salamiyah, Maarrat al-Nu'man, Sarmin and Duma. The Al Mira's emirs held similar authority under the Mamluks and were known as muluk al-arab ("kings of the Bedouin tribes; sing. malik al-'arab) in the southern Syrian Desert. The Al Fadl continued to wield influence during Ottoman rule.

== List of emirs ==
Name	Reign	Notes
Daghfal ibn al-Jarrah	971–mid-970s	First Jarrahid to be noted in medieval sources.
Mufarrij ibn Daghfal	977–1013	Son of Daghfal. Governed Palestine on behalf of the Fatimids, whom he often rebelled against and reconciled with.
Hassan ibn Mufarrij	1013–1041(?)	Son of Mufarrij. Governed Palestine on behalf of Fatimids and later became an ally of the Byzantines.
Hazim ibn Ali and Humayd ibn Mahmud	circa 1065–1067	Nephews of Hassan. Little is known of them other than their rebellion against the Fatimids.
Rabi'ah ibn Hazim	early 12th century.	Nothing is known of his activities.
Fadl ibn Rabi'ah	circa 1107	Son of Rabi'ah. Progenitor of the Al Fadl dynasty which dominated the Bedouin of Syria until the 18th century

== Bibliography ==
- Canard, Marius (1965). "D̲j̲arrāḥids". In Lewis, B.; Pellat, Ch. & Schacht, J. (eds.). The Encyclopaedia of Islam, Second Edition. Volume II: C–G. Leiden: E. J. Brill. pp. 482–485. OCLC 495469475.
- Cappel, Andrew J. (1994). "The Byzantine Response to the 'Arab (10th–11th Centuries)". In Dyck, Andrew Roy; Takács, Sarolta A. (eds.). Presence of Byzantium: Studies Presented to Milton V. Anastos in Honor of his Eighty-Fifth Birthday. A. Hakkert. ISBN 9789025610722.
- Kennedy, Hugh (2004) [1986]. The Prophet and the Age of the Caliphates: The Islamic Near East from the 6th to the 11th Century (Second ed.). Harlow: Longman. ISBN 978-0-582-40525-7.
- Gil, Moshe (1997) [1983]. A History of Palestine, 634–1099. Translated by Ethel Broido. Cambridge: Cambridge University Press. ISBN 0-521-59984-9.
- Hiyari, Mustafa A. (1975). "The Origins and Development of the Amīrate of the Arabs during the Seventh/Thirteenth and Eighth/Fourteenth Centuries". Bulletin of the School of Oriental and African Studies. 38 (3): 509–524. doi:10.1017/s0041977x00048060. JSTOR 613705. S2CID 178868071.
- Lev, Yaacov (2003). "Turks in the Political and Military Life of Eleventh-Century Egypt and Syria". In Hidemitsu, Kuroki (ed.). The Influence ff Human Mobility In Muslim Societies. Kegan Paul. ISBN 0710308027.
- Salibi, Kamal S. (1977). Syria Under Islam: Empire on Trial, 634–1097, Volume 1. Delmar: Caravan Books. ISBN 9780882060132.
