= Jarm =

Arab tribe

Jarm (Arabic: جرم, romanized: Jarm) (also spelled Jurm or Banu Jurum) were an Arab tribe that lived in Palestine, Hauran and Lower Egypt in the 13th–16th centuries. From their integration into the Mamluk military system in 1263 through the end of Mamluk rule, the Jarm were the principal Bedouin auxiliaries of the empire in Palestine. Significant numbers of the Jarm continued to inhabit the Gaza region into the 16th century under Ottoman rule.

== Origins ==
The Jarm were a branch of the Tha'laba clan, a subbranch of the Al Jadilah, itself a branch of the large Arab tribe of Tayy. Some sources, however, consider the Jarm to be from the non-Tayyid tribe of Quda'a. In the Arab genealogical tradition wherein Arabs descended either from Adnan (northern Arabs) or Qahtan (southern Arabs), both the Tayy and the Quda'a were considered Qahtanite.

== History ==
The Jarm are not mentioned in sources from the Fatimid (10th–11th centuries) or Crusader (1099–1187) periods. During Ayyubid (1187–1260) and Mamluk rule (1260–1516), the Jarm inhabited the environs of Gaza northward through the coastal plain of Palestine. Their main encampments were between Deir al-Balah and Gaza, while they often migrated to the vicinity of Hebron in the summer. The Mamluk sultan Baybars (r. 1260–1282) integrated the Jarm into the empire's military hierarchy as auxiliaries and they became the main Bedouin auxiliary group in Palestine. The Jarm, and other Tayyid clans, were entrusted with protecting the countryside, providing Arabian horses for the barid (postal route), and were taxed by the authorities.

The leaders of the Jarm and other Tayyid clans were referred to as 'emirs' (princes). In the Mamluk hierarchy, the military rank of the preeminent emir of the Jarm was equal to that of a Damascus-based amir ashara (emir of ten mamluks) or an Aleppo-based amir ashrin (emir of twenty mamluks). In the Mamluk records, the strength of the Jarm was 1,000 cavalry, making them one of the smaller leading tribes of Bilad al-Sham (the Levant); the largest was Al Fadl, the most powerful Tayyid clan. The Jarm emirs were at the helm of a confederation that included allies, neighbors and tributary clients of their tribe. The Jarm mainly intermixed with the Zabid (or Zubayd) tribe of the Hauran.

By the 15th century, the Jarm acted with great autonomy in southern Palestine. In 1415, there was heavy fighting between the Jarm and the A'id tribe in the triangle of Gaza, Ramla and Jerusalem. In 1494, a dispute arose regarding the official nomination of the preeminent emir of the Jarm, a duty normally entrusted to the Mamluk governors of Gaza or Jerusalem. Sultan Qaytbay ultimately intervened and chose the Jerusalem nominee because that district's governor paid a bribe of five hundred dinars. The Jarm emirs preserved the title of 'emir' during early Ottoman rule in the 16th century and were listed in the tax registers for the Gaza Sanjak. At the time, the tribe consisted of twelve branches and encamped in the vicinity of Ramla. It paid 10,000 akçe to the treasury of the Ottoman sultan.

== See also ==
- Banu Haritha, another of the major Tayyid auxiliary tribes of Palestine, active in the region's north.

== Bibliography ==
- Ayalon, David (1994). Islam and the Abode of War: Military Slaves and Islamic Adversaries. Ashgate Publishing Company. ISBN 9780860784302.
- Bakhit, Muhammad Adnan (1982). The Ottoman Province of Damascus in the Sixteenth Century. Librairie du Liban. ISBN 9780866853224.
- Cohen, Amnon; Lewis, Bernard (1978). Population and Revenue in the Towns of Palestine in the Sixteenth Century. Princeton University Press. ISBN 9781400867790.
- Hiyari, Mustafa A. (1975). "The Origins and Development of the Amīrate of the Arabs during the Seventh/Thirteenth and Eighth/Fourteenth Centuries". Bulletin of the School of Oriental and African Studies. 38 (3). doi:10.1017/s0041977x00048060. JSTOR 613705.
- Little, Donald P. (2004). "The Governance of Jerusalem under Qaytbay". In Winter, Michael; Levanoni, Amalia (eds.). The Mamluks in Egyptian and Syrian Politics and Society. Brill. ISBN 9004132864.
- Popper, William (1955). Egypt and Syria Under the Circassian Sultans, 1382–1468 A.D.: Systematic Notes to Ibn Taghrî Birdî's Chronicles of Egypt, Volumes 15–17. University of California Press.
- Rapoport, Yossef (2025). Becoming Arab: The Formation of Arab Identity in the Medieval Middle East. Princeton: Princeton University Press. ISBN 9780691210636.
- Sato, Tsugitaka (1997). State and Rural Society in Medieval Islam: Sultans, Muqta's, and Fallahun. Leiden: Brill. ISBN 90-04-10649-9.
- Tritton, A. S. (1948). "The Tribes of Syria in the Fourteenth and Fifteenth Centuries". Bulletin of the School of Oriental and African Studies. 12 (3/4). doi:10.1017/s0041977x00083129. JSTOR 608712.
- Ziadeh, Nicola A. (1970) [1953]. Urban Life in Syria under the Early Mamluks. Greenwood Press. ISBN 9780837131627.
