= Abu'l-Hasan Ali ibn Muhammad al-Maghribi =

Abu'l-Hasan Ali ibn Muhammad al-Maghribi (Arabic: أبو الحسن أحمد بن محمد المغربي) was a high-ranking official of the Abbasid Caliphate in the early 10th century. Of Persian origin, he became head of the diwan al-maghrib, the "Bureau of the West", whence his family acquired the nisbah of "al-Maghribi". Beginning with Abu'l-Hasan Ali, the Banu'l-Maghribi would form a dynasty of officials and statesmen that served several dynasties of the Middle East until their demise in the early 11th century. His son, al-Husayn continued to serve the Abbasids until he went over to the Ikhshidids and then the Hamdanids; his grandson, Ali, was in Hamdanid and later Fatimid service until his execution along with almost the entire family in 1010; his great-grandson, Abu'l-Qasim al-Husayn, escaped the massacre and served in the Buyid, Marwanid and Uqaylid courts until his death in 1027.

== Sources ==
- Smoor, Pieter (1986). "al-Mag̲h̲ribī". In Bosworth, C. E.; van Donzel, E.; Lewis, B. & Pellat, Ch. (eds.). The Encyclopaedia of Islam, Second Edition. Volume V: Khe–Mahi. Leiden: E. J. Brill. pp. 1210–1212. doi:10.1163/1573-3912_islam_SIM_4768. ISBN 978-90-04-07819-2.
