= Banu Lam =

Arab tribe in Southern Iraq and Central Arabia

Banu Lam بنو لام
- Qahtanite
- Ethnicity: Arab
- Nisba: al-Lami
- Location: Nejd, Saudi Arabia Baghdad, Iraq
- Parent tribe: Tayy
- Language: Arabic
- Religion: Islam

Banu Lam (Arabic: بنو لام) is an Arab tribe of central Arabia and southern Iraq. The tribe claims descent from the ancient Arab tribe of Tayy. It dominated western Nejd (the region between Medina and al-Yamama) before the 15th century. The tribe split into three main bedouin (nomadic) groups: the Fudhool, the Al Kathir, and the Al Mughira. Many clans from Bani Lam, however, remained in Nejd as settled townspeople.

The tribe got its name from Lam bin Hareta, a Qahtan chief from Hejaz. Members of the tribe often engaged in conflict with both the Safavid and Ottoman authorities in the region. During World War I, the tribe fought alongside their Ottoman overlords under the leadership of Sheikh Gazban. Part of the tribe also resides in the Khuzestan province of Iran.
