= Tayy =

Arabian tribe

- Kahlanite Arab tribe
- Nisba: Arabic: الطائي, romanized: Aṭ-Ṭāʾī
- Location: 2nd century CE–10th century: Jabal Tayy and Syrian Desert; 10th century–16th century: Jabal Tayy, Syrian Desert, Jibal al-Sharat, al-Balqa, Palmyrene Steppe, Upper Mesopotamia, Northern Hejaz, Najd
- Descended from: Julhumah bin 'Udad bin Zayd bin Yashjub bin Arib
- Parent tribe: Kahlan
- Branches: Al al-Ghawth; Jarrahids; Al Fadl; Al Mira; Banu Nabhan; Banu Hani; Shammar; Al Jadilah; Al-Tha'alib; Banu Lam; Sardiyya; Banu Saqr
- Religion: Polytheism (pre-630); Miaphysite Christianity (pre-638); Islam (post 630)

The Tayy (Arabic: طيء/ALA-LC: Ṭayyi’; Musnad: 𐩷𐩺), also known as Ṭayyi, Tayyaye, or Taiyaye, are a large and ancient Arab tribal confederation. The nisba (patronymic) of Tayy is aṭ-Ṭāʾī (ٱلطَّائِي). In the second century CE, they migrated to the northern Arabian ranges of the Shammar and Salma Mountains, which then collectively became known as the Jabal Tayy, and later Jabal Shammar. The latter continues to be the traditional homeland of the tribe until the present day. They later established relations with the Sasanian and Byzantine empires.

Though traditionally allied with the Sasanian client state of the Lakhmids, the Tayy supplanted them as the rulers of al-Hirah in the 610s. In the late sixth century, the Fasad War split the Tayy, with members of its Jadila branch converting to Christianity and migrating to Syria where they became allied with the Ghassanids, and the Ghawth branch remaining in Jabal Tayy. A chieftain and poet of the Al Ghawth, Hatim al-Ta'i, is widely known among Arabs until today.

Adi ibn Hatim and another Tayy chieftain, Zayd al-Khayr, converted to Islam together with much of their tribe in 629–630, and became companions of the Prophet. The Tayy participated in several Muslim military campaigns after Muhammad's death, including in the Ridda Wars and the Muslim conquest of Persia. Al-Jadila in northern Syria remained Christian until the Muslim conquest of the Levant in 638.

The Tayy were split during the First Fitna, with those based in Arabia and Iraq supporting Ali as caliph and those in Syria supporting Mu'awiya. The latter and his Umayyad kinsmen ultimately triumphed and members of the Tayy participated in the Umayyad conquest of Sindh in the early eighth century. Nonetheless, a branch of the Tayy under Qahtaba ibn Shabib al-Ta'i were among the leaders of the Abbasid Revolution which toppled the Umayyads in the mid-eighth century. The Tayy fared well under the Abbasid Caliphate, producing military officials and renowned poets such as Buhturi and Abu Tammam.

By the mid-9th century, Abbasid authority had eroded and the Tayy were left dominant in the southern Syrian Desert and Jabal Tayy. Under the Jarrahids, they established themselves in Palestine under Fatimid rule. As the virtually independent rulers of the area between Ramla and Jabal Tayy, they controlled the key routes between Egypt, Syria, Arabia and Iraq. They vacillated between the Fatimids and the Byzantines and then between the Seljuks and Crusaders until the late 12th and early 13th centuries, when the Tayy's various subbranches, chief among them the Al Fadl, were left as the last politically influential Arab tribe in the region extending from Najd northward to Upper Mesopotamia.

== Genealogy ==
The Tayy's progenitor, according to early Arab genealogists, was Julhumah ibn Udad, who was known as "Tayy" or "Tayyi". The theory in some Arab tradition, as cited by 9th-century Muslim historian al-Tabari, holds that Julhumah's laqab (surname) of Ṭayyiʾ derived from the word ṭawā, which in Arabic means "to plaster". He received the name because he was said to have been "the first to have plastered the walls of a well", according to al-Tabari. Julhumah's ancestry was traced to Kahlan ibn Saba ibn Ya'rub, great-grandson of Qahtan, the semi-legendary, common ancestor of the Arab tribes of southern Arabia. Julhumah was a direct descendant of Kahlan via Julhumah's father Zayd ibn Yashjub, who in turn was a direct descendant of 'Arib ibn Zayd ibn Kahlan.

=== Branches ===
The two main branches of Tayy were Al al-Ghawth and Al Jadilah. The former was named after al-Ghawth, a son of Julhumah. The immediate offspring of al-Ghawth's son, 'Amr, were Thu'al, Aswadan (commonly known as Nabhan), Hani, Bawlan and Salaman. The offspring of Thu'al (Banu Thu'al) and Aswadan (Banu Nabhan) became leading sub-branches of the Tayy in northern Arabia, while the offspring of Hani (Banu Hani) became a major sub-branch in southern Mesopotamia. According to traditional Arab genealogists, the Banu Thu'al were the ancestors of the Banu Rabi'ah of Syria, and in turn of the Al Fadl emirs.

The Al Jadilah's namesake was a woman of the Tayy named Jadilah, whose sons Hur and Jundub became the progenitors of Banu Hur and Banu Jundub, respectively. The latter produced the numerous Al al-Tha'alib (Tha'laba) subbranch, which itself produced the Banu La'm, which became a leading sub-branch of Al Jadilah in northern Arabia. The Jarm (or Jurum) may have also been a branch of the Al al-Tha'alib.

According to the 14th-century Arab historian and sociologist, Ibn Khaldun, the Tayy were among those Qahtanite tribes who lived in the hills and plains of Syria and Mesopotamia and intermarried with non-Arabs. Ibn Khaldun further stated that Tayyid tribesmen did "not pay any attention to preserving the (purity of) lineage of their families and groups". Thus the lineage of the Tayy's many subbranches was difficult for genealogists to accurately ascertain.

== Pre-Islamic era ==
=== Migration to Jabal Tayy ===
The Banu Tayy were originally based in Yemen, but migrated to northern Arabia in the late 2nd century CE, in the years following the dispersion of the Banu Azd from Yemen.

They largely lived among the north Arabian mountain ranges of Aja and Salma with Khaybar north of Medina as their most important oasis, and from there they would make incursions into Syria and Iraq during times of drought. Their concentration in Jabal Aja and Jabal Salma lent the mountain ranges their ancient, collective name "Jabal Tayy". Prior to the Tayy migration, the mountains had been the home of the Banu Assad, who lost some territory with the arrival of Tayyid tribesmen. However, the two tribes ultimately became allies in later centuries and intermarried. In ancient times, the two main branches of the Tayy were the Al al-Ghawth and Al Jadila. The tribesmen lived in different parts of the region, with those living among the mountains known as the "al-Jabaliyyun" (the Mountaineers), those on the plain (mostly from Al Jadila) known as "as-Sahiliyyun" (the Plainsmen) and those on the desert sands known as "al-Ramliyyun".

=== Relations with Sassanids and Byzantines ===
==== Fifth century ====
The Tayy were so widespread and influential throughout the Syrian Desert that Syriac language authors from Upper Mesopotamia used their name (Taienos, Tayenoi, Taiyaya or Ṭayyāy, ܛܝܝܐ), to describe Arab tribesmen in general, or even to refer to Muslims, and ܛܝܝܐܝܬ Ṭayyāyīṯ for Arabic, much the same way that authors from Byzantine Syria and Egypt used "Saracenos". The Syriac term was borrowed by the Sasanian Empire as Middle Persian: Tāzīg, New Persian Tāzī (تازی), also meaning "Arab". For the Tayy specifically, Syriac authors would use the word "Tu'aye".

The Tayy were subjects of the Sasanian Empire. However, they were also counted as allies by the Byzantine Empire's chief Arab foederati in the early to mid-5th century, the Salihids. The Tayy are mentioned in the late 5th century as having raided numerous villages in the plains and mountains of the Syrian Desert, including parts of Byzantine territory. This prompted the Byzantine army to mobilize its Arab clients at the desert frontiers with Sassanid-held Mesopotamia to confront the Tayy.

The Byzantines demanded restitution from the Tayy, but the Sasanian general Qardag Nakoragan instead initiated negotiations that called for the Byzantine Arab clients to restore livestock and captives taken from Sasanian territory in previous years in exchange for compensation from the Tayy. The negotiations succeeded, and the Sasanians and Byzantines delineated their borders to prevent future raiding between their respective clients. However, to the embarrassment of the Sasanian and the outrage of the Byzantines, four hundred Tayyid tribesmen raided several minor villages in Byzantine territory while representatives of the two sides were meeting in Nisibis. Despite this violation of the bilateral agreement, the Sasanian-Byzantine peace held.

==== Sixth century ====
Throughout the 6th century, the Tayy continued their relations with the Sasanians and their chief Arab clients, the Lakhmid kingdom of Mesopotamia. Towards the end of the 6th century, a Tayyid chief named Hassan assisted the Sasanian emperor Khosrow II when the latter fled from his usurper, Bahram Chobin, by giving him a horse. A few years later, the Lakhmid governor of al-Hira, al-Nu'man III ibn al-Mundhir, fell out with Khosrow II, who had been restored to the throne, and sought safety with the Tayy. The tribe refused to grant refuge to al-Nu'man, who was married to two Tayyid women. He was ultimately killed by the Sasanians in 602. A Tayyid chief, Iyas ibn Qabisah al-Ta'i, subsequently migrated to al-Hira with his kin and became its governor, ruling from 602 to 611. The Banu Bakr opposed the rule of Iyas and began raiding Sasanian territory in southern Mesopotamia. In response, Iyas commanded pro-Sasanian Arab and Persian troops against the Banu Bakr at the Battle of Dhi Qar in 609, in which the Sasanians were defeated.

According to historian Irfan Shahid, evidence suggests that clans of the Tayy moved into Byzantine-held Syria beginning in the 6th century. By then, the Ghassanids had supplanted the Salihids as the Byzantines' main foederati, and the Salihids began living alongside the Tayy in the region of Kufa. In the late 6th century, the Al al-Ghawth and Al Jadila fought against each other in the 25-year-long Fasad War (harb al-Fasad) in northern Arabia. Numerous atrocities were committed by both factions and the war resulted in the migration of several Jadila clans from the north Arabian plains to Syria, while the Al Al-Ghawth remained in Jabal Aja and Jabal Salma. The Jadila tribesmen founded a hadir (military encampment) near Qinnasrin (Chalcis) called "Hadir Tayyi" after the tribe. The Ghassanid king al-Harith ibn Jabalah brokered a peace between the Tayy factions, ending the Fasad War. Afterward, the Tayy's relations with the Ghassanids, which had previously been checkered, were much improved. The Al Jadila converted to Christianity, the religion adopted decades earlier by the Ghassanids. Some other clans of the Banu Tayy remained pagan, worshiping the deities of Ruda and al-Fils. Those who converted to Christianity apparently embraced their new faith zealously and produced two well-known priests, named in Syriac sources as Abraham and Daniel.

Sometime during the 6th century, the Tayy and the Asad formed a confederation, which was later joined by the Ghaṭafān. The alliance collapsed when Asad and the Ghaṭafān assaulted both the Āl al-Ghawth and Āl Jadīlah and drove them out of their territories in the Jabal Tayy. However, one of the leaders of the Asad, Dhu al-Khimarayn Awf al-Jadhami, defected from the Ghaṭafān soon after and reestablished the alliance with the Tayy. Together, they campaigned against Ghaṭafān and restored their territories in the Jabal Tayy.

== Islamic era ==
=== Emergence of Islam ===
The Tayy's initial reaction to the emergence of Islam in Arabia was varied: some embraced the new faith, while others resisted. The Tayyid clans of Jabal Tayy, all of whom lived in proximity to one another, maintained close relationships with the inhabitants and tribes of Mecca and Medina, the birthplace of Islam. Among their contacts in Mecca were tribesmen from the Quraysh, the tribe of Muhammad. There was a degree of intermarriage between the Tayy and Quraysh.

The Tayy also had some interaction with the Jewish tribe of Banu Nadir, including with the father of one of its leading members and an enemy of the early Muslims, Ka'b ibn al-Ashraf (died 624), who was a Tayy. In the first years of Muhammad's mission, individual members of certain Tayyid clans converted to Islam. Among these early converts were Suwayd ibn Makhshi who fought against the pagans of Mecca, including two of his kinsmen, in the Battle of Badr in 624; Walid ibn Zuhayr who served as a guide for the Muslims in their expedition against the Banu Asad in Qatan in 625; and Rafi' ibn Abi Rafi', who fought under Muslim commander Amr ibn al-As in the Battle of Chains in October 629.

In 630, Muhammad dispatched his cousin, Ali, on an expedition to destroy the Tayy's principal idol, al-Fils, in Jabal Aja. As a result of the expedition, the Tayy's Kufa-based Eastern Christian chieftain, Adi ibn Hatim, who belonged to the Banu Thu'ayl branch of the Al al-Ghawth, fled to Syria with some of his tribesmen to join other Tayyid clans, but his sister was captured. The Tayyid clans that remained in Jabal Tayy, including Banu Ma'n, Banu Aja, Banu Juwayn and Banu Mu'awiya, converted to Islam. Meanwhile, Adi's sister beckoned Muhammad to release her, which he did after learning that her father was Hatim ibn Abdullah. Out of respect for the latter's honorable reputation, Muhammad gave her good clothes and money and had her escorted to her family in Syria. Impressed by Muhammad's treatment of his sister, Adi met Muhammad and converted to Islam, along with most of his kinsmen.

In 630–31, a delegation of fifteen Tayyid chiefs led by Zayd al-Khayr, who belonged to the Banu Nabhan clan of the Al al-Ghawth, converted to Islam and pledged allegiance to Muhammad. The latter was uniquely impressed by Zayd, who died a year later. Thus, by the time of Muhammad's death, the Arabia-based clans of the Al Jadilah and Al al-Ghawth had become Muslims. In doing so, they firmly broke away from their long-time alliance with the Banu Assad and Ghatafan.

=== Ridda Wars ===
Following Muhammad's death in 632, several Arab tribes rebelled against his Rashidun successor, Caliph Abu Bakr, switching their allegiance to Tulayha of the Banu Asad. The Tayy's allegiance during the ensuing Ridda Wars is a "widely disputed matter", according to historian Ella Landau-Tasseron. Some Muslim traditions claim all of the Tayy remained committed to Islam, while Sayf ibn Umar's tradition holds they all defected. Landau-Tasseron asserts that neither extreme is correct, with some Tayy leaders, foremost among them Adi ibn Hatim, fighting on the Muslim side and others joining the rebels. However, Tayyid rebels did not engage in direct conflict with the Muslims.

Muhammad had appointed Adi to collect sadaqa (tribute) from the Tayy and Banu Asad. After Muhammad's death and the resulting chaos among the Muslims and the belief that Islam would imminently collapse, those among the Tayy who had paid their sadaqa (in this case, 300 camels) to Adi demanded the return of their camels or they would rebel. Adi either advised them to abandon this demand because Islam would survive Muhammad's death and they would be viewed as traitors or threatened to fight against them if they revolted. After this encounter, the accounts of contemporary and early Muslim historians vary. It is clear, that Adi played an integral role in preventing much of the rebellious clans of Tayy from actually fighting the Muslims and preventing the Muslims from attacking the Tayy. When he heard news of Abu Bakr's dispatch of a Muslim army against the Tayy in Syria, he sought to stop their march by smuggling the contested 300 camels to Abu Bakr, making the Tayy the first tribe to pay the sadaqa, an action that was widely lauded by Muhammad's companions.

It is apparent that Adi's traditional rivals within the Tayy from the Banu Nabhan (led by Zayd's son Muhalhil) and Banu La'm (led by Thumama ibn Aws), or at least some of their members, joined Tulayha in Buzakha (in northern Najd), while their other members also defected but remained in Jabal Tayy. Adi persuaded the latter to return to Islam, which they agreed to. However, they refused to abandon their tribesmen in Buzakha, fearing Tulayha would hold them hostage if he discovered they joined the Muslims. Thus, Adi and the Muslim Tayyids devised a strategy to lure the Tayy in Tulayha's camp to return to Jabal Tayy by issuing a false claim that the Muslims were attacking them. When the apostate Tayyids reached their tribesmen in Jabal Tayy, far from Tulayha's reach, they discovered the false alarm and were persuaded to rejoin Islam. With this, the entirety of the Al al-Ghawth had returned to the Muslim side. However, the Al Jadila remained in revolt and the Muslim commander Khalid ibn al-Walid was set to move against them. He was stopped by the intercession of Adi, who was able secure the Al Jadila's allegiance through diplomacy.

The consensus in all Muslim traditions is that the Tayy of Arabia was firmly on the Muslims' side by the time of the Battle of Buzakha in September 632. The Tayy supposedly were given their own banner in the Muslim army, per their request, which was a testament to their influence since only the Ansar (core of the Muslim force) had their own banner. At the Battle of Buzakha against Tulayha, Adi and Muknif ibn Zayd, who unlike Zayd's other son Muhalhil had fought alongside the Muslims from the start, commanded the right and left wings of the Muslim army. The "Tayyaye d-Mhmt" were reported by Thomas the Presbyter as fighting with Romans 12 miles east of Gaza in 634.

=== Rashidun conquests ===
During the Battle of the Bridge against the Sassanids in 634, another of Zayd's sons, Urwah, participated and was said by al-Baladhuri to have "fought so fiercely that his action was estimated to be equivalent to be that of a whole group of men". During the battle, Christian Tayy tribesmen on the Sassanid side defected to the Muslim army, preventing an imminent Muslim rout. Among those who defected were the poet Abu Zubayd at-Ta'i. Urwah later fought at the Battle of al-Qadisiyah and died fighting the Daylamites. The Al Jadila tribesmen based in Qinnasrin did not join their Arabian counterparts and fought alongside the Byzantines during the Muslim conquest of Syria. The Muslim general Abu Ubaidah ibn al-Jarrah encountered them in their hadir in 638, after which many agreed to convert to Islam, though a large section remained Christian and agreed to pay jizya (poll tax). Most of the Christian tribesmen became Muslims in the few years after, with few exceptions.

=== Umayyad period ===
In the first Muslim civil war, the Tayy under Adi were strong supporters of Ali against the Umayyads. They fought alongside him at the Battle of the Camel and the Battle of Siffin in 656 and 657, respectively. During the latter battle, a chief of the tribe, Sa'id ibn Ubayd at-Ta'i, was slain. Unlike the Tayy of Arabia, the Tayy in Syria led by Habis ibn Sa'd at-Ta'i aligned with the Umayyads, who assigned Habis as the commander of Jund Hims. In a confrontation between the two sides in Iraq, Habis was killed. Habis was the maternal uncle of Adi's son, Zayd, and the latter was angered by his slaying, prompting him to seek out and kill the Ali loyalist, a member of the Banu Bakr, responsible for Habis's death. Zayd's act was sharply condemned by Adi who threatened to hand him over to Ali, prompting Zayd to defect to the Umayyads. Afterward, Adi smoothed over the consequent tension with Ali's camp by reaffirming his loyalty. The Umayyads ultimately triumphed and established a caliphate that had reached the Indian subcontinent by the early 8th century. A Tayyid commander named al-Qasim ibn Tha'laba ibn Abdullah ibn Hasn played an instrumental role in the Umayyad conquest of Sindh in 712 by killing the country's Hindu king Raja Dahir in battle.

=== Abbasid period ===
The Abbasids contested leadership of the caliphate and overtook the Umayyads in what became known as the Abbasid Revolution in the mid-8th century. The leader of the Abbasid movement in Khurasan in northeastern Persia was a member of the Tayy, Qahtaba ibn Shabib. The tribe fared well during Abbasid rule. A prominent akhbari (transmitter of hadith) in the early 9th century was a Tayyid named al-Haytham ibn Adi (died 822). Two major poets from the Tayy also emerged in the 9th century: Abu Tammam and al-Buhturi. The former, who authored the Hamasah anthology, may not have been an actual member of the tribe, but had adopted the tribe as his own.

Abbasid authority in Syria and Iraq eroded considerably after the beginning of the "Anarchy at Samarra" in 861, which left the vast expanse of the Syrian and Arabian deserts without governmental oversight. During this period, the Tayy dominated the southern part of the Syrian Desert, the Banu Kilab dominated the northern part and the Banu Kalb dominated central Syria. The latter tribe, whose presence in the region had preceded the Muslim conquest and the migration of the Tayy and Kilab, was largely sedentarized, while the Tayy and Kilab, being relative newcomers to the region, were still highly mobile nomadic groups. According to Kamal Salibi, the Tayy's "chief military asset, in fact, was their Bedouin swiftness of movement". Moreover, the durable connections the Tayy of Syria maintained with their north Arabian counterparts in Jabal Tayy made them virtually independent and prone to revolt against the various Muslim states in Syria and Iraq.

The Tayy made their abode in Transjordan and the Bilad al-Sharat mountains between Transjordan and the Hejaz. Here they first received attention in 883 when they launched a revolt that spanned southern Syria and the northern Hejaz. The Tayy's revolt prevented the passage of the annual Hajj caravan from Damascus to Mecca until it was quashed by the Tulunid ruler Khumarawayh (884–896) in 885. For the remainder of Khumarawayh's reign, the Tayy remained suppressed, possibly due to the help of older-established Arab tribes like the Judham and Lakhm. However, law and order once again broke down during the reigns of Khumarawayh's successors Jaysh and Harun between 896 and 904. This coincided with the rising strength of the anarchist Qarmatian movement in eastern Arabia and southern Iraq. The Tayy associated themselves with the Qarmatians to establish their dominance of southern Syria; with likely Qarmatian encouragement, the Tayy launched a revolt between Syria and the Hejaz in 898, during which they plundered caravans and disrupted lines of communication.

=== Fatimid period ===
When the Qarmatians attacked Ikhshidid-controlled Palestine in 968, the leading Tayyid clan of Jarrah came with them and firmly established themselves in the country. However, under the Jarrahid chieftains, the Tayy assisted the Fatimids, who conquered the Ikhshidids, against the Qarmatians in 971 and 977. During the latter occasion, the Jarrahid chieftain Mufarrij ibn Daghfal captured the pro-Qarmatian rebel, Alptakin, and handed him over to the Fatimids in exchange for a large reward. In return for his support, Mufarrij was appointed by the Fatimids as the governor of Ramla, the traditional Muslim capital of Palestine. Mufarrij was also the preeminent chieftain of the Banu Tayy tribe as a whole, giving him authority over his Bedouin and peasant kinsmen in an area extending from the coast of Palestine eastward through Balqa and to the Tayy's traditional homeland in northern Arabia. While his Fatimid assignment gave him prestige, Mufarrij's tribal authority was the source of his independent power. The Tayyid-dominated region was the location of the overland routes connecting Egypt, Syria, Iraq and Arabia. This gave Mufarrij significant leverage with the Fatimids, who thus could not afford alienating him and risk him switching allegiance to the Fatimids' rivals in Iraq, the Buwayhids.

In 981–82, relations between the Jarrahids and the Fatimids collapsed and the former were driven out of Palestine. They sacked a Hajj pilgrim caravan later in 982, then annihilated a Fatimid army at Ayla, before being defeated and forced to flee north toward Homs. Between then and Mufarrij's death in 1013, the Tayy switched allegiance between the various regional powers, including the Fatimids, Byzantines, and the Hamdanids' Turkish governor of Homs, Bakjur. By the time of Mufarrij's death, the Jarrahids had restored their dominant position in Palestine. Mufarrij's son, Hassan, maintained relations with the Fatimids under Caliph al-Hakim, but when the latter disappeared, Hassan's relations with his successor deteriorated.

In 1021, the Banu Nabhan led by Hamad ibn Uday besieged the Khurasani pilgrim caravan in Fayd near Jabal Tayy despite being paid off by the Khurasani sultan, Mahmud of Ghazni. During this period, in 1025, the Tayy made an agreement with the Kilab and the Kalb, whereby Hassan ibn Mufarrij of Tayy ruled Palestine, Sinan ibn Sulayman of the Kalb ruled Damascus and Salih ibn Mirdas of the Kilab ruled Aleppo. Together, they defeated a Fatimid punitive expedition sent by Caliph az-Zahir at Ascalon, and Hassan conquered al-Ramla. The alliance fell apart when the Kalb defected to the Fatimids, who decisively defeated the Tayy and Kilab near Lake Tiberias in 1029, prompting Hassan and his tribesmen to flee northward.

The Tayy established an alliance with the Byzantines and upon the latter's invitation, the 20,000-strong Tayy of Syria relocated their encampments from the vicinity of Palmyra to the al-Ruj plain, near Byzantine-held Antioch, in 1031. The Tayy continued to fight alongside the Byzantines under Hassan and his son Allaf, protecting Edessa from Numayrid and Marwanid advances in 1036. In 1041, the Jarrahids regained control of Palestine, but the Fatimids continued to go to war against them. The Jarrahids continued to disrupt Fatimid rule until the Fatimids were driven out of Syria and Palestine in 1071.

=== Later Islamic era ===
With the end of the Fatimid era in Syria and Palestine, descendants of Mufarrij entered the service of the Muslim states of the region, first with the cadet branches of the Seljuk Empire, beginning with the Burids of Damascus, then their Zengid successors, who came to rule all of Syria and Upper Mesopotamia. At times, the Tayy fought alongside the Crusaders, who had conquered the Syrian coastal regions, including Palestine, in 1098–1100. By the end of the 11th century, the Banu Rabi'ah branch of the Tayy (direct descendants of Mufarrij) and the Mazyadid branch of the Banu Assad were the last influential Arab tribes in Syria and Iraq, with the rest having "disappeared from the political map", according to historian Mustafa A. Hiyari.

The tribal distribution in the Syrian and north Arabian deserts had significantly changed by the late 12th century as a result of the decline of several major tribes, the expansion of others, namely the Tayy, and the gradual assimilation of substantial Bedouin population with the settled inhabitants. The Tayy were left as the predominant tribe of the entire Syrian steppe, Upper Mesopotamia, Najd and the northern Hejaz. The Tayy divisions and their respective territories at the time were as follows: The Al Fadl of Banu Rabi'ah controlled the regions of Homs and Hama eastward to Qal'at Ja'bar at the Euphrates Valley and southward along the valley through Basra and ultimately to the al-Washm region of central Najd; the Al Mira of Banu Rabi'ah controlled the Golan Heights and the area southward to the al-Harrah field north of Mecca; the Al Ali branch of the Al Fadl controlled the Ghouta region around Damascus and southeastward to Tayma and al-Jawf in northern Najd; the Shammar and Banu Lam controlled Jabal Aja and Jabal Salma; the Ghuzayya held territories within parts of Syria, the Hejaz and Iraq that were controlled by the Banu Rabi'ah. In Lower Egypt, the Sunbis branch of the Tayy lived in the Buhayrah district, while the Tha'laba branch inhabited the area stretching from Egypt's Mediterranean coast northeastward to al-Kharruba in the western Galilee. The Tha'laba were particularly influential in the al-Sharqiyah district in the Nile Delta. The Banu Jarm, who inhabited the area stretching from Gaza to the northern coastline of Palestine, were also a Tayyid tribe according to some sources, while others consider them to be from the Quda'a tribe.

During Mamluk rule, the Bedouin of Syria were used as auxiliaries in the Mamluks' wars with the Mongols based in Iraq and Anatolia. In central and northern Syria, the Bedouin came under the authority of the Al Fadl emirs in their capacity as the hereditary officeholders of the amir al-ʿarab (commander of the Bedouin) post, beginning with Emir Isa ibn Muhanna (r. 1260–1284). The Al Mira emirs held a similar, but lower-ranking office, in southern Syria, and its preeminent emir was known as malik al-ʿarab (king of the Bedouin). In al-Sharqiyah, the Tha'laba, whose encampments were close to the Mamluk seat of government, were tasked with maintaining and protecting the barid (postal route) in their district and were occasionally appointed to government posts. The Tayy in Syria and Egypt were both required to supply Arabian horses to the Mamluks for use in the army and barid. Sultan an-Nasir Muhammad had a special affinity for the Bedouin and maintained strong relations with the tribes of Syria and Egypt. However, following his death, the state's relations with the Bedouin deteriorated. The Tha'laba left their semi-permanent camp in al-Sharqiya to maraud across the country and joined the revolt of the al-A'id tribe in the mid-14th century.

== Bibliography ==
- Abu Izzedin, Nejla M. (1993). The Druzes: A New Study of Their History, Faith, and Society. Leiden: Brill. ISBN 90-04-09705-8.
- Bräu, H. H. (1936). "Ṭaiy". In Houtsma, M. Th.; et al. (eds.). Encyclopaedia of Islam (1st ed.). Leiden: Brill. ISBN 9789004082656.
- Canard, Marius (1991) [1965]. "D̲j̲arrāḥids". In Lewis, B.; Pellat, Ch.; Schacht, J. (eds.). The Encyclopedia of Islam. Vol. 2 (2nd ed.). Leiden and New York: Brill. pp. 482–485. ISBN 90-04-07026-5.
- Hitti, Philip K. (1916). The Origins of the Islamic State, Being a Translation from the Arabic, Accompanied with Annotations, Geographic and Historic Notes of the Kitâb Fitûh Al-buldân of Al-Imâm Abu-l Abbâs Ahmad Ibn-Jâbir Al-Balâdhuri, Volume 1. New York: Columbia University, Longmans, Green and Company. p. 224.
- Hiyari, Mustafa A. (1975). "The Origins and Development of the Amīrate of the Arabs during the Seventh/Thirteenth and Eighth/Fourteenth Centuries". Bulletin of the School of Oriental and African Studies. 38 (3): 509–524. doi:10.1017/s0041977x00048060. JSTOR 613705. S2CID 178868071.
- Ibn 'Abd Rabbih (2011). Boullata, Emeritus Issa J. (ed.). The Unique Necklace, Volume III. Reading: Garnet Publishing Limited & Southern Court. pp. 294–295. ISBN 9781859642405.
- Landau-Tasseron, Ella (1984). "The Participation of Tayyi in the Ridda". Jerusalem Studies in Arabic and Islam. 5.
- Levanoni, Amalia (1995). A Turning Point in Mamluk History: The Third Reign of Al-Nāṣir Muḥammad Ibn Qalāwūn (1310–1341). Brill. ISBN 9789004101821.
- Madelung, Wilferd (1997). The Succession to Muhammad: A Study of the Early Caliphate. Cambridge: Cambridge University Press. ISBN 9780521646963.
- Landau-Tasseron, Ella (1998). Yar-Shater, Ehsan (ed.). The History of al-Tabari, Volume 39: Biographies of the Prophet's Companions and their Successors. Albany: State University of New York Press. ISBN 0-7914-2819-2.
- Maulana, Mohammad (2006). Encyclopaedia Of Quranic Studies, Volume 14: Islamic Philosophy under Quran. Anmol Publications Pvt. Ltd. p. 163.
- Salibi, Kamal S. (1977). Syria Under Islam: Empire on Trial, 634–1097, Volume 1. Delmar: Caravan Books. ISBN 9780882060132.
- Sato, Tsugitaka (1997). State and Rural Society in Medieval Islam: Sultans, Muqtaʻs, and Fallahun. Leiden: Brill. ISBN 90-04-10649-9.
- Shahid, Irfan (1986). Byzantium and the Arabs in the Fourth Century. Washington, D. C.: Dumbarton Oaks Research Library and Collection. ISBN 0-88402-116-5.
- Shahid, Irfan (1989). Byzantium and the Arabs in the Fifth Century. Washington, D. C.: Dumbarton Oaks Research Library and Collection. ISBN 0-88402-152-1.
- Shahid, Irfan (1995). Byzantium and the Arabs in the Sixth Century, Volume 1, Part 1: Political and Military History. Washington, D. C.: Dumbarton Oaks Research Library and Collection. ISBN 0-88402-214-5.
- Shahid, Irfan (2000). "Tayyi'". In Bearman, P. J.; et al. (eds.). Encyclopedia of Islam, Second Edition, Volume 10. Leiden: Brill. ISBN 90-04-11211-1.
- Siddiqui, Muhammad Yasin Mazhar (1987). Organisation of Government Under the Prophet. Delhi: Idarah-i Adabiyat-i Delli.
