= Mufarrij ibn Daghfal ibn al-Jarrah =

11th-century Jarrahid emir, Tayy tribe leader

Mufarrij ibn Daghfal ibn al-Jarrah al-Tayyi (fl. ca. 977–1013), in some sources erroneously called Daghfal ibn Mufarrij, was an emir of the Jarrahid family and leader of the Tayy tribe. Mufarrij was engaged in repeated rebellions against the Fatimid Caliphate, which controlled southern Syria at the time. Although he was several times defeated and forced into exile, by the 990s Mufarrij managed to establish himself and his tribe as the de facto autonomous masters of much of Palestine around Ramlah (the district of Jund Filastin) with Fatimid acquiescence. In 1011, another rebellion against Fatimid authority was more successful, and a short-lived Jarrahid-led Bedouin state was established in Palestine centred at Ramlah. The Bedouin even proclaimed a rival Caliph to the Fatimid al-Hakim, in the person of the Alid Abu'l-Futuh al-Hasan ibn Ja'far. Bedouin independence survived until 1013, when the Fatimids launched their counterattack. Their will to resist weakened by Fatimid bribes, the Bedouin were quickly defeated. At the same time Mufarrij died, possibly poisoned, and his sons quickly came to terms with the Fatimids. Among them, Hassan ibn Mufarrij al-Jarrah managed to succeed to his father's position, and became a major player in the politics of the region over the next decades.

== Early life and career ==
Map of Early Islamic Syria and its provinces in the 9th–10th centuries

Mufarrij was the son of Daghfal ibn al-Jarrah, a member of the Banu Tayy who was the first of the Jarrahid family to rise to prominence, as an ally of the Qarmatians in their wars with the Fatimids in the early 970s. During this time, the Jarrahids emerged to lead the Banu Tayy opposition to the first attempts by the Fatimids, who had just captured Egypt, to impose their control over Palestine.

Mufarrij first appears in the aftermath of the Battle of Ramlah in 977, where the Turkish ruler of Damascus, Alptekin, was defeated by the forces of the Fatimid caliph al-Aziz. Alptekin fled the field and almost died of thirst in the desert, until he was found by Mufarrij, who had in earlier times befriended him. Mufarrij rescued Alptekin and brought him to his home, but while his guest rested, he went to al-Aziz and betrayed Alptakin in exchange for the 100,000 gold dinars the Caliph had promised as a reward for his capture.

Mufarrij next appears in 979, when the Hamdanid emir Abu Taghlib arrived in Palestine fleeing from the Buyid conquest of his domains in the Jazira, and became embroiled in the complex power struggles between the Fatimid government and local elites. Abu Taghlib with his followers established himself in Jawlan and endeavoured to gain recognition by the Fatimids as governor of Damascus, but the rebel general al-Qassam, who held the city, repulsed him. Under attack by the Damascenes, and with members of his family starting to desert him, Abu Taghlib moved further south to the region of Lake Tiberias. Hoping to sow discord among the Arab tribes and weaken their power to the benefit of the Fatimids, the local Fatimid general al-Fadl ibn Salih promised Ramlah to Abu Taghlib, even though he himself had previously handed Mufarrij a document from al-Aziz that gave the city to the Jarrahids. When Abu Taghlib, joined by Mufarrij's rivals, the Banu Uqayl, attacked Ramlah, Mufarrij called upon al-Fadl for aid. Al-Fadl agreed, and in the ensuing battle on 29 August Abu Taghlib was defeated and taken captive by Mufarrij. After parading him through Ramlah tied to a camel, Mufarrij killed his prisoner with his own hands to prevent him from being used by the Fatimids against him in the future. This episode cemented Mufarrij's control over Ramlah and marked his and his tribe's rise to a powerful position in local affairs. With their rivals defeated, the Tayy now became "the major bedouin power in the area", according to Hugh Kennedy, and a continuing nuisance to the Fatimids, since although they recognized Fatimid authority, in practice Mufarrij and his followers acted as independent agents.

== Rebellions against the Fatimids and exile ==
The accord between Mufarrij and al-Fadl soon ended, and the Fatimid general turned against the Jarrahids, but through diplomatic means Mufarrij succeeded in getting al-Aziz to order his general to cease the attacks on him. Nevertheless, Mufarrij and his men followed this up with destructive raids across Palestine in 980. On 7 July 981, while the Fatimid army was engaged in besieging Qassam in Damascus, Mufarrij openly rebelled against the Fatimids, and was joined by Bishara, the governor of Tiberias, who joined the bedouin along with many of his men, mostly former Hamdanid soldiers. The Fatimids responded by dispatching another army, headed by Rashiq al-Azizi, which quickly routed the Jarrahids. The latter fled south into the Hejaz, where they attacked a caravan of Hajj pilgrims returning from Mecca in June 982, before in turn destroying a pursuing Fatimid army under Muflih al-Wahbani at Ayla.

After this success Mufarrij and his men returned to Palestine where they confronted Rashiq, but were again defeated and forced to flee across the desert to Homs, where Bakjur, the local governor on behalf of the Hamdanid emir of Aleppo, Sa'd al-Dawla, took them in and catered for them, probably in winter 982. Despite this hospitality, the Tayy now went north and sought to enter the service of the Byzantine Empire. Emperor Basil II accepted their request, and a few months later, in autumn 983, the Tayy fought alongside the Byzantines under the doux of Antioch, Bardas Phokas, when he went to relieve Aleppo from an attack by Bakjur, who had rebelled against Sa'd al-Dawla.

Soon afterwards, Mufarrij apparently obtained a pardon (aman) for himself and his followers from al-Aziz, although when he returned to the Fatimid domains in late 983 or early 984 he allied himself with Bakjur, who was now the Fatimid governor of Damascus, against the Fatimid vizier Ibn Killis. In the end, in 988 Ibn Killis prevailed upon al-Aziz to oust Bakjur, and an army was sent against the allies. The Fatimid commander, Munis, took Ramlah, but the Jarrahids withdrew north towards Damascus. Munis recruited the other Arab tribes, rivals of the Tayy, in his ranks, and in a battle at Dariya, near Damascus, his forces defeated the troops of Bakjur and Mufarrij. This forced Bakjur to relinquish his post on 29 October and retreat with his followers north to Raqqa on the Euphrates. Mufarrij and his men followed Bakjur, and in 989 are recorded as attacking yet another Hajj caravan in north Arabia.

== Return to Palestine ==
"O Commander of the Faithful, maintain peace with the Byzantines as long as they maintain peace with you. Be satisfied if the Hamdanids [of Aleppo] recognize you in the mint and the [Friday] oration. Do not spare Mufarrij ibn Daghfal ibn Jarrah, [however], if you get hold of him."

— Advice of Ya'qub ibn Killis to al-Aziz on his deathbed.

Only after Ibn Killis' death in 991 could Mufarrij return to Palestine; the vizier had remained implacably opposed to Mufarrij, whom he regarded as a dangerous individual and on his deathbed he had urged al-Aziz to execute Mufarrij should he be captured. Nevertheless, the Caliph pardoned the Jarrahid. In 992, al-Aziz invited Mufarrij to participate in the campaign against Aleppo under the Turkish general Manjutakin, but it is unclear whether Mufarrij fought in this or the subsequent campaigns.

Al-Aziz died in October 996 and was succeeded by his under-age son, al-Hakim, whereupon a fierce factional struggle erupted between the Turkish troops, led by Manjutakin, on the one hand, and the Kutama Berbers, who under al-Hasan ibn 'Ammar moved to seize control of the caliphal government. Mufarrij sided with Manjutakin and fought alongside him in the battle outside Ascalon, but the Berber general Sulayman ibn Ja'far ibn Fallah was victorious. Mufarrij, however, managed once more to emerge unscathed. As the orientalist Marius Canard writes, "following his usual tactics", he "did not hesitate to desert [Manjutakin] and to cross over to Sulayman's camp", and it was his son Ali who pursued and took Manjutakin prisoner.

In 997, Mufarrij tried to capture Ramlah and devastated the surrounding lands, but was attacked by the new governor of Damascus, Jaysh ibn Samsama, and forced to once again flee to the lands of his fellow Tayy in the mountains of northern Hejaz. There, Canard says, "on the point of being captured he took part in a little comedy, sending the old women of his tribe to ask for aman and pardon, which were granted". In 1005/6, Mufarrij sent his sons Ali, Hassan and Mahmud to lead a Bedouin army to assist the Fatimid army sent to quell the rebellion of Abu Rikwa. In the next year, however, he is again found holding up one of the pilgrim caravans from Baghdad while it was crossing Tayy territory, and forcing them to pay tribute to him.

== Renewed revolt and autonomous rule ==
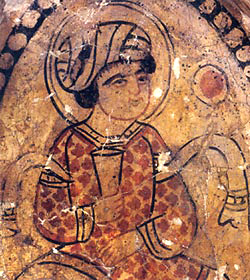
Portrait of Caliph al-Hakim

In 1011, Abu'l-Qasim al-Husayn, son of the executed Abu'l-Hasan Ali ibn al-Husayn al-Maghribi, fled to Palestine, where he sought refuge in Hassan ibn Mufarrij's camp. In response, al-Hakim charged the Turkish governor of Ramlah, Yarukh, with assembling an army to bring Abu'l-Qasim and his Jarrahid protectors to heel. Mufarrij's two other sons, Mahmud and Ali, were in Egypt at the time, and, having learned of the Caliph's preparations, rushed to their father to warn him. Together, Abu'l-Qasim and the younger Jarrahids convinced Mufarrij of the danger represented by Yarukh and the need to confront him before he reached Ramlah. Consequently, the Jarrahids prepared to attack the Fatimid army at Gaza. Yarukh was informed of this, and planned to catch the ambushers by surprise by having 1,000 cavalry from the Ramlah garrison strike them in the rear along with his own troops. In the event, however, the messenger he sent to Ramlah to inform the garrison was captured by the Jarrahids, and Hassan managed to ambush Yarukh and capture him and his family near Rafiah. Upon Abu'l-Qasim's suggestion, the Jarrahids now raised all the tribesmen of the Jund Filastin to open revolt and recruited them for an attack on Ramlah, the provincial capital. Ramlah fell and was pillaged by the Bedouin, who had been offered "a general licence to despoil and plunder" (M. Gil).

Learning of these events, al-Hakim wrote to Mufarrij and reproached him, demanding the safe return of Yarukh to Egypt, while at the same time offering the sum of 50,000 dinars if the Jarrahids would again submit. Abu'l-Qasim, who feared that Mufarrij was inclined to accept, persuaded Hassan to have Yarukh executed. The Jarrahids followed this open act of rebellion by recognizing an anti-caliph in the person of the Alid Sharif of Mecca, Abu'l-Futuh al-Hasan ibn Ja'far, in July 1012. Abu'l-Qasim himself journeyed to Mecca, where he persuaded Abu'l-Futuh to accept the role. The latter, assuming the title of al-Rashid bi'llah ("Righteous with God"), succeeded in winning the recognition of the holy cities of Mecca and Medina, and went to Ramlah. On his arrival there in September, he was greeted with jubilation by the Bedouin, and the local preacher read the Friday prayer in his name.

Mufarrij also tried to win support among the Christians, and possibly curry the favour of the Byzantine Empire as well, by sponsoring restorations of the Church of the Holy Sepulchre in Jerusalem, which had recently been demolished on the orders of al-Hakim, and by arranging the re-appointment of a patriarch, Theophilus I, to the vacant see. The Jarrahids seem to have had close relations with the Christians and maintained contact with Byzantium, a fact which would play a role in later events.

This period marked the apogee of the Bedouin power in Palestine: as the contemporary historian Yahya of Antioch writes, the entire interior of the land, "from al-Farama to Tiberias", was under their control, with only the coastal cities resisting the siege attempts, and coins were minted in Abu'l-Futuh's name. This period of short-lived Bedouin domination had a considerable negative impact on the region. Kennedy remarks that "it was marked by the destruction and desolation of many of the settled communities, and as elsewhere in the Fertile Crescent at this period, the extension of nomad-controlled area at the expense of the urban and agricultural areas."

Despite its apparent success, Bedouin power was fragile, as the Jarrahids proved susceptible to bribery. Al-Hakim sent large sums and gifts to Mufarrij and his sons, with Hassan in return sending back the grandsons of Jawhar al-Siqilli, who had been entrusted to his care, to be executed. Abu'l-Futuh began to have second thoughts, as the Jarrahids increasingly treated him disrespectfully after the money he had brought with him ran out. Eventually he returned to Mecca and Fatimid allegiance. Abu'l-Qasim too feared a Jarrahid rapprochement with the Fatimids, and fled for Iraq, eventually rising to become a vizier for the Marwanid and Uqaylid rulers of the Jazira. Finally, in July/August 1013, al-Hakim sent a 24,000-strong army under Ali ibn Ja'far ibn Fallah against the Bedouins who were heavily defeated and lost control over Ramlah. Mufarrij died, possibly poisoned by agents of the Caliph and, at the same time, his two sons Ali and Mahmud surrendered. Thereupon Hassan too secured a pardon, and managed to retain his father's lands in Palestine. Although initially loyal to the Fatimids, he too held ambitions to rule Palestine as an autonomous ruler. From 1024, he launched a series of rebellions, allied with the Christians of Palestine and the Byzantines. His success, like his father's, was short-lived, which ended at the Battle of al-Uqhuwana.

== Sources ==
- Bianquis, Thierry (1986). Damas et la Syrie sous la domination fatimide (359-468/969-1076): essai d'interprétation de chroniques arabes médiévales. Tome premier (in French). Damascus: Institut français de Damas. ISBN 978-2-35159130-7.
- Canard, Marius (1965). "D̲j̲arrāḥids". In Lewis, B.; Pellat, Ch. & Schacht, J. (eds.). The Encyclopaedia of Islam, Second Edition. Volume II: C–G. Leiden: E. J. Brill. pp. 482–485. OCLC 495469475.
- Gil, Moshe (1997) [1983]. A History of Palestine, 634–1099. Translated by Ethel Broido. Cambridge: Cambridge University Press. ISBN 0-521-59984-9.
- Kennedy, Hugh (2004) [1986]. The Prophet and the Age of the Caliphates: The Islamic Near East from the 6th to the 11th Century (Second ed.). Harlow: Longman. ISBN 978-0-582-40525-7.
- Salibi, Kamal S. (1977). Syria Under Islam: Empire on Trial, 634–1097, Volume 1. Delmar: Caravan Books. ISBN 9780882060132.
