= Al-Haraki =

Al-Heraki الحراكي Al-Heraki, Alheraki
- Village
- Location in Syria
- Coordinates: 34°43′27″N 37°2′54″E
- Country: Syria
- Governorate: Homs
- District: Al-Mukharram
- Subdistrict: Al-Mukharram

Population (2004)
  - Total: 2,238
- Time zone: UTC+2 (EET)
  - Summer (DST): +3

Al-Heraki (Arabic: الحراكي) is a village in central Syria, administratively part of the Homs Governorate, located northeast of Homs. Nearby localities include Umm al-Amad to the northwest, Umm Jbab and al-Mukharram to the north, Al-Sankari to the northeast, Furqlus to the southeast and al-Sayyid to the south. According to the Syria Central Bureau of Statistics (CBS), al-Heraki had a population of 2,238 in the 2004 census.
