= Al Rayyan (disambiguation) =

Al Rayyan is a municipality in Qatar.

Al Rayyan, Ar Rayyan, etc. may also refer to:

== Places ==
- Al Rayyan (city), a city in the east of Al Rayyan municipality, Qatar
- Al-Rayyan, Syria
- Ar Rayyan, Saudi Arabia
- Wadi El Rayan, a nature reserve in Egypt
- Wadi ar-Rayyan in Jordan, area rich in dolmens

== Organisations ==
- Al-Rayyan SC, a Qatari professional sports club
- Alrayyan TV, a Qatari media company
- Al Rayan Bank, a British Islamic bank

== See also ==
- Rayan, a name
- Rayan, Idlib, a village in Syria
- Rayyan Sarafand, a Lebanese football club
