= Jubb =

Jubb may refer to:

== People ==
- Jubb (surname)

== Geography ==
- jubb (Arabic: جُبّ ) also spelled jeb, a kind of well in which stones have not been used in its construction
  - Jubb Yusuf (Arabic: جُب يوسف), also called 'Arab al-Suyyad, was a Palestinian village depopulated in the 1948 Arab–Israeli War
  - Jubb'adin (Arabic: جبعدين) village in southern Syria, administratively part of the Rif Dimashq Governorate, located northeast of Damascus
  - Jubb al-Jarrah (Arabic: جب الجراح) village in central Syria, administratively part of the Homs Governorate.
  - Jubb al-Ghar (Arabic: جب الغار jubb al-ghār) Syrian village located in Shathah Nahiyah in Al-Suqaylabiyah District, Hama
  - Jubb Ramlah (Arabic: جب رملة) village in northwestern Syria, administratively part of the Hama Governorate
  - Jubb al-Shami (Arabic: جب الشامي) hamlet east of Homs
  - Jubb al-Uthman (Arabic: جب العثمان) Syrian village located in Al-Hamraa Nahiyah in Hama District, Hama
  - Jubb al-Safa (Arabic: جب الصفا) village in southern Syria, administratively part of the Markaz Rif Dimashq District

== See also ==
- Jubb, play by Keith Waterhouse
