= Jabab Hamad =

Jabab Hamad جباب حمد Jbab Hamad, Jibab Hamad
- Location in Syria
- Coordinates: 34°39′24″N 37°17′2″E
- Country: Syria
- Governorate: Homs Governorate
- District: Homs District
- Nahiya: Furqlus

Population (2004)
  - Total: 378
- Time zone: UTC+3 (AST)

Jabab Hamad (Arabic: جباب حمد, also spelled Jbab Hamad or Jibab Hamad) is a village in central Syria, administratively part of the Homs Governorate, east of Homs. Situated in the Syrian Desert (which is also called the Hamad Desert), nearby localities include Furqlus, al-Sayyid and Fatim al-Amuq to the west. According to the Central Bureau of Statistics, Jabab Hamad had a population of 378 in the 2004 census. By 23 February 2025, the village was completely uninhabited.
