= JUB =

JUB may refer to:

- AJUBA, a gene for a human protein that is part of many complexes
- Jacobs University Bremen, a private research university in Germany
- Jaiminiya Upanishad Brahmana, a Vedic text
- Juba Airport in South Sudan (IATA code)

== See also ==
- Jub Jub (disambiguation)
- Jubb (disambiguation)
- Jab (disambiguation)
