= Al-Mukharram al-Tahtani =

Al-Mukharram al-Tahtani مخرم التحتاني
- Village
- Location in Syria
- Coordinates: 34°51′7″N 37°2′52″E
- Country: Syria
- Governorate: Homs
- District: Al-Mukharram
- Subdistrict: Al-Mukharram

Population (2004)
  - Total: 3,035
- Time zone: UTC+2 (EET)
  - Summer (DST): +3

Al-Mukharram al-Tahtani (Arabic: مخرم التحتاني) is a village in central Syria, administratively part of the Homs Governorate, located northeast of Homs. Nearby localities include Ayn al-Niser to the west, Umm al-Amad to the southwest, al-Mukharram to the southeast and Danibah and Khunayfis to the north. According to the Syria Central Bureau of Statistics (CBS), al-Mukharram al-Tahtani had a population of 3,035 in the 2004 census.
