= Khilfah =

Khilfah خلفة
- Village
- Location in Syria
- Coordinates: 34°53′2″N 37°11′56″E
- Country: Syria
- Governorate: Homs
- District: Mukharram
- Subdistrict: Mukharram

Population (2004)
  - Total: 1,068
- Time zone: UTC+2 (EET)
  - Summer (DST): +3
- City Qrya Pcode: C2917

Khilfah (Arabic: خلفة) is a village in Syria located east of Homs in the Al-Mukharram District, Homs Governorate. According to the Syria Central Bureau of Statistics, Khilfah had a population of 1,068 in the 2004 census.
