= Buwaydah =

Buwaydah, al-Buwaydah, Buweida or Bweideh may refer to the following places in Syria:

- Buwaydah, Salamiyah, a village in central Syria, located east of Hama
- Buwaydah, Suran, a village in central Syria, located north of Hama
- Buwaydat Rihaniyah, a village in central Syria, located east of Homs
- al-Buwaydah al-Sharqiyah, a village in central Syria, located south of Homs
- Buwaydat al-Suwayqat, a village in northwestern Syria, part of the Tartus Governorate
