= Abu Qatur =

Abu Qatur أبو قاطور
- village
- Location in Syria
- Coordinates: 34°43′29″N 37°21′53″E
- Country: Syria
- Governorate: Homs
- District: Mukharram
- Subdistrict: Jubb al-Jarrah

Population (2004)
  - Total: 1,252
- Postal code: C2939

Abu Qatur (Arabic:أبو قاطور) is a village in the Homs Governorate, specifically the Jubb al-Jarrah subdistrict. According to the 2004 Census, Abu Qatur had a population of 1,252.

== History ==
The Syrian Arab Army captured Abu Qatur from ISIS on 8 September 2017.
