= Al-Rayyan, Syria =

Al-Rayyan الريان
- Village
- Location in Syria
- Coordinates: 34°39′7″N 36°51′9″E
- Country: Syria
- Governorate: Homs
- District: Homs
- Subdistrict: Homs

Population (2004)
  - Total: 4,876

Al-Rayyan (Arabic: الريان) is a village in central Syria, administratively part of the Homs Governorate, located southeast of Homs. Nearby localities include Sakrah to the north, al-Haraki to the northeast, al-Sayyid to the east, al-Riqama to the southeast, Judaydat al-Sharqiyah to the southwest, Maskanah to the west and Zaidal and Fairouzeh to the northwest. According to the Syria Central Bureau of Statistics (CBS), al-Rayyan had a population of 4,876 in the 2004 census.
