= Tell al-Ward =

Tell al-Ward تل الورد
- Town
- Location in Syria
- Coordinates: 34°49′23″N 37°13′29″E
- Country: Syria
- Governorate: Homs
- District: Al-Mukharram
- Subdistrict: Al-Mukharram

Population (2004)
  - Total: 156
- Time zone: UTC+2 (EET)
  - Summer (DST): UTC+3 (EEST)
- City Qrya Pcode: C2916

Tell al-Ward (Arabic: تل الورد) is a village in Syria located within the Mukharram District, Homs Governorate. At the time of the 2004 Syrian census, it had a population of 156 people. As of 12 February 2025, the settlement is uninhabited.
