= Jubb Abbas =

Jubb Abbas جب عباس Jub Abbas Jeb Abbas
- Village
- Location in Syria
- Coordinates: 34°45′N 37°00′E
- Country: Syria
- Governorate: Homs
- District: Al-Mukharram
- Subdistrict: Mukharram

Area
  - Total: 0.54 km^{2} (0.21 sq mi)

Population (2004)
  - Total: 538
- Time zone: UTC+2 (EET)
  - Summer (DST): +3
- City Qrya Pcode: C2926

Jubb Abbas (Arabic: جب عباس, also spelled Jub Abbas or Jeb Abbas) is a village in Syria located east of Homs in the Al-Mukharram District, Homs Governorate. Jubb Abbas had a population of 538 residents according to the 2004 census.

== Syrian Civil War ==
On November 1, 2011, 11 men were killed near the village, at least two of whom were residents.
