= Umm Jabab =

Umm Jabab أم جباب
- Village
- Umm Jbab
- Location in Syria
- Coordinates: 34°46′29″N 37°4′48″E
- Country: Syria
- Governorate: Homs
- District: Al-Mukharram
- Subdistrict: Al-Mukharram

Population (2004)
  - Total: 1,209
- Time zone: UTC+3 (EET)
  - Summer (DST): UTC+2 (EEST)

Umm Jabab (Arabic: أم جباب) is a village in central Syria, administratively part of the Homs Governorate, south of Homs. Nearby localities include al-Mukharram to the north and Jubb al-Jarrah to the northeast. According to the Central Bureau of Statistics, Umm Jabab had a population of 1,209 in the 2004 census.
