= Bouthaina Shaaban =

Syrian politician, academic and author (born 1953)

- بثينة شعبان
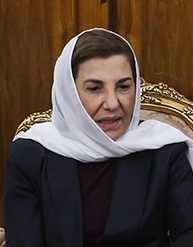
- Shaaban in Iran, 2003

Political and Media Adviser to the Presidency of the Syrian Arab Republic
- In office 2008 – 8 December 2024
- President: Bashar al-Assad

1st Minister of Expatriates
- In office 2002 – 30 July 2008
- Preceded by: Office established
- Succeeded by: Joseph Sweid

Personal details
- Born: 1953 (age 72–73) Masudiyah, Homs, Syria
- Party: Ba'ath Party
- Spouse: Khalil Jawad
- Children: 3

Bouthaina Shaaban (Arabic: بثينة شعبان; born 1953) is a Syrian academic and politician who served as political and media adviser to the presidency under Bashar al-Assad until his overthrow in 2024. Shaaban had previously served as the first Minister of Expatriates for the Syrian Arab Republic between 2002 and 2008, and was described as the Syrian government's face to the outside world at the time.

== Life and education ==
Shaaban was born in 1953 to an Alawite family in Masudiyah, Homs. She has been a member of the Syrian Regional Branch of the Arab Socialist Ba'ath Party since the age of 16. She was educated in Britain and obtained her Ph.D. in English literature from the University of Warwick. Shaaban is married to Iraqi Dr. Khalil Jawad. The couple have two daughters and a son.

== Career ==
Shaaban worked first as an interpreter for the Syrian presidents Hafez al-Assad and Bashar al-Assad, his son. Under Hafez she became an adviser to the Foreign Ministry, and in 2003 she was named Minister of Expatriates, "a new post created to try to lure wealthy Syrian expatriates abroad — or at least their resources — back home." In 2008, she was appointed political and media adviser to president Bashar al-Assad. Between 1985 and 2003 she was also professor of Romantic poetry at the English department of Damascus University.

Shaaban was particularly visible in English-speaking media after the Valentine's Day 2005 assassination of former Lebanese Prime Minister Rafiq Hariri, when she participated in several television interviews and wrote several op-ed pieces attacking the United Nations probe into Syrian involvement in the murder and insisted that Israel and the United States were responsible for Hariri's assassination. In August 2011, the U.S. sanctioned Shaaban with five other Syrian officials.

She is the author of Both Right and Left Handed: Arab Women Talk About Their Lives (1988), a book composed mostly of interviews with Syrian, Lebanese, Palestinian, and Algerian women. In this study, Shaaban invited Arab women to talk openly about their lives and the roles of women in their societies, how they feel they have changed through different times of war and crisis, and what they think the future holds for Arab women. Another of her books published in English is her study of Arab female writers Voices revealed: Arab women novelists, 1898-2000.

In his article of 2012, "Failing the masses: Buthaina Shabaan and the public intellectual crisis", A. Al-Saleh described her public image like this: "The shift of Shabaan from being a feminist to serving the propaganda of the regime has damaged her integrity as an intellectual."

== Connections to Syrian leadership ==
Shaaban's rise within the Ba'athist Syrian government was speculated to be due to her close friendship with Bushra Al-Assad, daughter of Hafez al-Assad. Sometime in the late 1980s, Shaaban also introduced Bushra to her future husband Assef Shawkat.

During the Syrian Civil War, Shaaban mentioned in January 2020 that the Syrian economy is "50 times better than 2011", despite the deterioration of the value of the Syrian pound against the U.S. dollar. Later on, she said that Syrians have no choice but "patience and steadfastness" upon the implementation of the Caesar Act.

She remained part of the Ba'athist government until its end, serving as Political and Media Adviser to Bashar al-Assad until his overthrow in 2024. It was reported that during the fall of Damascus in 2024, Bashar al-Assad kept his plans to flee the country secret from most officials, including members of his own family. According to reports, Assad contacted Shaaban, asking her to come to his residence to prepare a written statement. However, upon her arrival, she found the residence abandoned. The day after the collapse of the Ba'athist regime, Shaaban was reportedly seen in Dubai, as figures of the ousted regime had fled Syria to escape potential prosecution.

== Honors ==
In 2005, Shaaban was presented with "the Most Distinguished Woman in a Governmental Position" award by the Arab League.

== Bibliography ==
- Wright, Robin B. (2008). Dreams and Shadows: the Future of the Middle East. Penguin Group. ISBN 978-1-59420-111-0.
