= Al-Mushrifah =

Village in Syria

Al-Mushrifah المشرفة Al-Mishirfeh
- Village
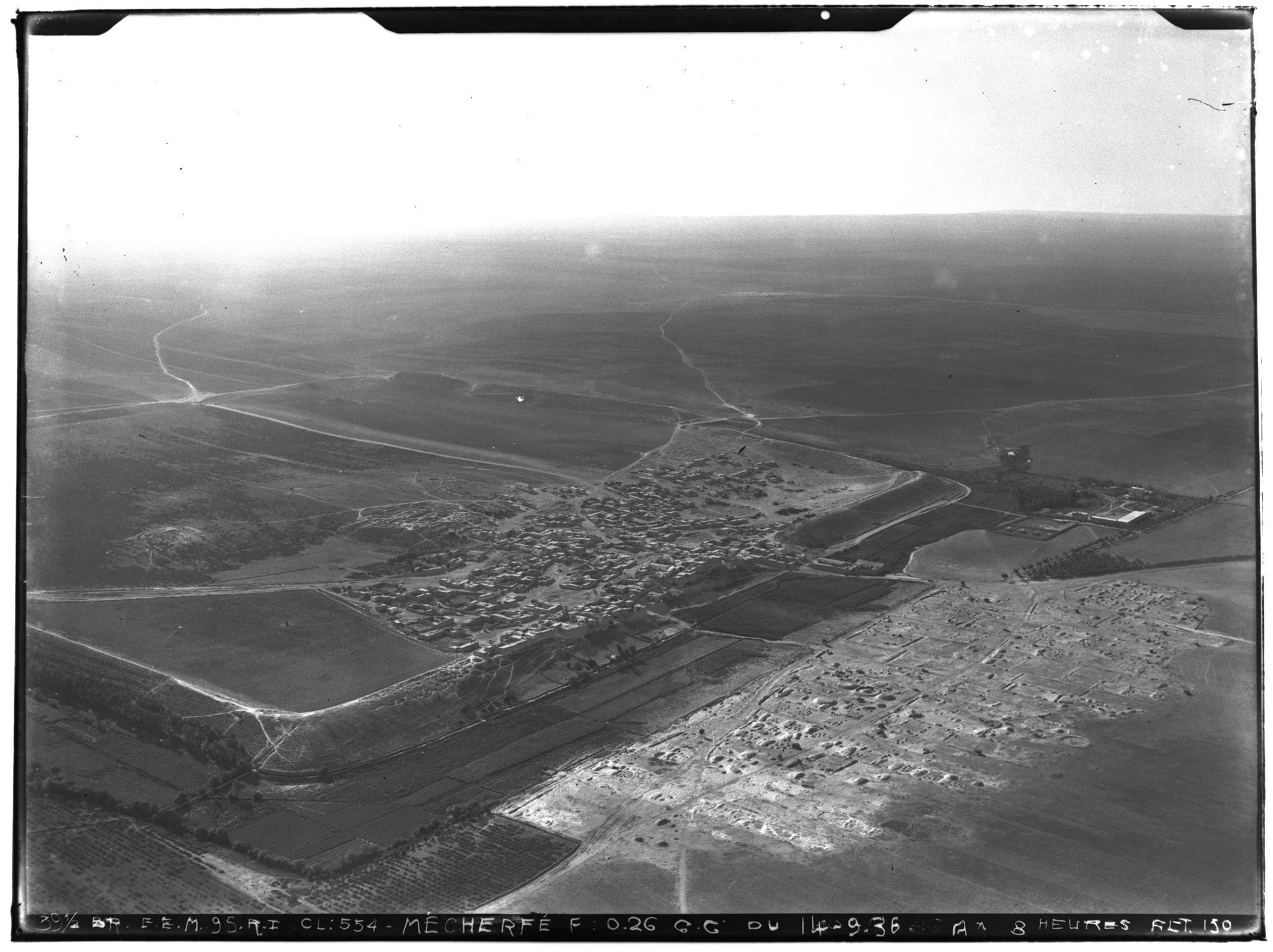
- 1936 aerial view of Al-Mushrifah

- Location in Syria
- Coordinates: 34.834479°N 36.850971°E
- Country: Syria
- Governorate: Homs
- District: Homs
- Subdistrict: Ayn al-Niser

Population (2004)
  - Total: 14,868
- Time zone: UTC+3 (AST)

Al-Mushrifah (Arabic: المشرفة, also spelled al-Mishirfeh, el-Mishrife or Musharrfeh) is a village in central Syria, administratively part of the Homs Governorate, located northeast of Homs, with a population of 14,868 in 2004. Nearby localities include Ayn al-Niser, Umm al-Amad and al-Mukharram to the east, and Talbiseh, al-Ghantu and Teir Maalah to the west. Outside the modern town is Tell el-Mishrife, the site of the ancient city-state of Qatna. It has a religiously mixed population of Sunni Muslims, Alawites and Christians. The village contains several mosques and two churches.

== History ==
In the mid-19th century, the village of al-Mushrifah was built within the ancient site of Qatna (Tell al-Mishrifeh). Houses were built on top of the royal palace floors, which caused some damage to them while also providing a protective cover for the underlying ruins. In 1940, its population was 1,500. In the 1950s, under the influence of the Syrian Communist Party, some of the peasants of al-Mushrifah rose against their landlord by seizing his harvest. In 1982, the Syrian Directorate-General of Antiquities and Museums resettled the inhabitants in a new village next to the ancient tell, making the site available for modern archaeological research.

== Bibliography ==
- Abdulrahman, Ammar; Luciani, Marta; Morandi Bonacossi, Daniele; Novák, Mirko; Pfälzner, Peter (2016). "The Syrian-Italian-German Mission at Tall Mishrife/ Qatna: Results of the First Season in 1999". In Thuesen, Ingolf (ed.). Proceedings of the 2nd International Congress on the Archaeology of the Ancient Near East 22–26 May 2000, Copenhagen. Vol. 1: The Environment. Images of Gods and Humans. The Tell. Excavation Reports and Summaries Varia (Chronology, Technology, Artifacts). Department of History and Cultures, University of Bologna / Eisenbrauns. ISBN 978-8-861-13007-4.
- Batatu, Hanna (1999). Syria's Peasantry, the Descendants of Its Lesser Rural Notables, and Their Politics. Princeton University Press. ISBN 0691002541.
- Morandi Bonacossi, Daniele (2005). "The Ancient Lake of Mishrifeh". In Morandi Bonacossi, Daniele; al-Maqdissi, Michel (eds.). The Metropolis of the Orontes Art and Archaeology from the Ancient Kingdom of Qatna. Seven Years of Syrian-Italian Collaboration at Mishrifeh/Qatna. Salhani Printing Establishment. OCLC 496581031.
