= Buwaydat Rihaniyah =

Buwaydat Rihaniyah بويضة الريحانية
- Village
- Location in Syria
- Coordinates: 34°51′40″N 37°8′37″E
- Country: Syria
- Governorate: Homs
- District: Mukharram
- Subdistrict: Mukharram

Population (2004)
  - Total: 419
- Time zone: UTC+2 (EET)
  - Summer (DST): +3
- City Qrya Pcode: C2923

Buwaydat Rihaniyah (Arabic: بويضة الريحانية) is a village in Syria located east of Homs in the Al-Mukharram District, Homs Governorate. According to the Syria Central Bureau of Statistics, Buwaydat Rihaniyah had a population of 419 in the 2004 census.
