= Masudiyah =

Mas'udiyah مسعودية
- Location in Syria
- Coordinates: 34°51′35″N 37°18′18″E
- Country: Syria
- Governorate: Homs
- District: Al-Mukharram
- Subdistrict: Jubb al-Jarrah

Population (2004)
  - Total: 1,755
- Time zone: UTC+2 (EET)
  - Summer (DST): +3

Mas'udiyah (Arabic: مسعودية) is a village in central Syria, administratively part of the Homs Governorate, located northeast of Homs. Nearby localities include subdistrict center Jubb al-Jarrah to the south and Barri Sharqi to the northwest. According to the Syria Central Bureau of Statistics (CBS), Mas'udiyah had a population of 1,755 in the 2004 census. Its inhabitants are predominantly Alawites.

On 23 December 2016, ISIL launched an attack on the village, resulting in the deaths of 13 local militia members.
