= Al-Sankari =

Al-Sankari السنكري
- Village
- Location in Syria
- Coordinates: 34°48′35″N 37°8′6″E
- Country: Syria
- Governorate: Homs
- District: Mukharram
- Subdistrict: Mukharram

Population (2004)
  - Total: 3,549
- Time zone: UTC+2 (EET)
  - Summer (DST): +3
- City Qrya Pcode: C2914

Al-Sankari (Arabic: السنكري) is a village in Syria located east of Homs in the Al-Mukharram District, Homs Governorate. According to the Syria Central Bureau of Statistics, Al-Sankari had a population of 3,549 in the 2004 census.
