= Ayn al-Niser =

Ayn al-Niser عين النسر
- Village
- Location in Syria
- Coordinates: 34.841387°N 36.928139°E
- Country: Syria
- Governorate: Homs
- District: Homs
- Subdistrict: Ayn al-Niser
- Elevation: 472 m (1,549 ft)

Population (2004)
  - Total: 604
- Time zone: UTC+3 (AST)

Ayn al-Niser (Arabic: عين النسر, also spelled Ain al-Nisr or Ayni-Nasir) is a town in central Syria, administratively part of the Homs Governorate, located northeast of Homs. Nearby localities include al-Mishirfeh to the west, Ayn al-Dananir to the northwest, Izz al-Din to the north, al-Mukharram al-Fawqani to the east and Umm al-Amad to the southeast.

According to the Central Bureau of Statistics (CBS), Ayn al-Niser had a population of 604 in the 2004 census. It is the administrative center and 11th largest locality of the Ayn al-Niser nahiyah ("subdistrict") which consists of 16 localities with a collective population of 30,267. The inhabitants of the village are ethnic Circassians from the Shapsugh, Kabardian and Bzhedug tribes.
