= Abu Hakfah al-Janubi =

Abu Hakfah al-Janubi أبو حكفة الجنوبي Abo Hakfa
- Village
- Location in Syria
- Coordinates: 34°53′13″N 37°8′33″E
- Country: Syria
- Governorate: Homs
- District: Mukharram
- Subdistrict: Mukharram

Population (2004)
  - Total: 1,036
- Time zone: UTC+2 (EET)
  - Summer (DST): +3

Abu Hakfah al-Janubi (Arabic: أبو حكفة الجنوبي; also spelled Abo Hakfa) is a village in northern Syria located east of Homs in the Homs Governorate. According to the Syria Central Bureau of Statistics, Abu Hakfah al-Janubi had a population of 1,036 in the 2004 census. Its inhabitants are predominantly Alawites.
