= Jab (disambiguation) =

A jab is a type of punch used in the martial arts.

JAB was an Australian punk rock band in the 1970s.

Jab or JAB may also refer to:

== Codes ==
- Jab, ISO 639-3 code for the Hyam language
- JAB, IATA code for Jabiru Airport, Australia
- JAB code, a color 2D matrix barcode inspired by QR code

== Vehicles ==
- J.A.B. (Jungle Airborne Buggy) Ultra Lightweight Truck, a prototype 4x4 vehicle manufactured by Standard Motors
- M1074 Joint Assault Bridge (JABS) an armored military engineering vehicle based on the Abrams M1A1 main battle tank

== Other uses ==
- Jab, an informal term for an injection
- JAB Holding Company, a German conglomerate headquartered in Luxembourg
- Jab Murray (1892–1958), American football player
- Joint Seat Allocation Authority, Indian government agency overseeing admission into higher educational institutes
- Yelmek language, also known as Jab, a Papuan language of West Papua, Indonesia

== See also ==
- The Big JAB, a network of sports radio stations in Maine, US
- Djab wurrung, an Aboriginal Australian group
  - Djabwurrung language, spoken by them
- JABS (Justice, Awareness and Basic Support), a vaccine-hesitant group in the UK
- YAB (disambiguation)
