= Jubb al-Shami =

Jubb al-Shami جب الشامي Job al-Shamie
- Village
- Location in Syria
- Coordinates: 34°28′0″N 37°3′0″E
- Country: Syria
- Governorate: Homs Governorate
- District: Homs District
- Nahiya: Furqlus

Population (2004)
  - Total: 35
- Time zone: UTC+3 (AST)

Jubb al-Shami (Arabic: جب الشامي) is a hamlet east of Homs. According to the Central Bureau of Statistics (CBS), its population was 35 in 2004. The inhabitants lived in five households.
