= Jubb Yusuf =

Jubb Yusuf جُب يوسف
- Village
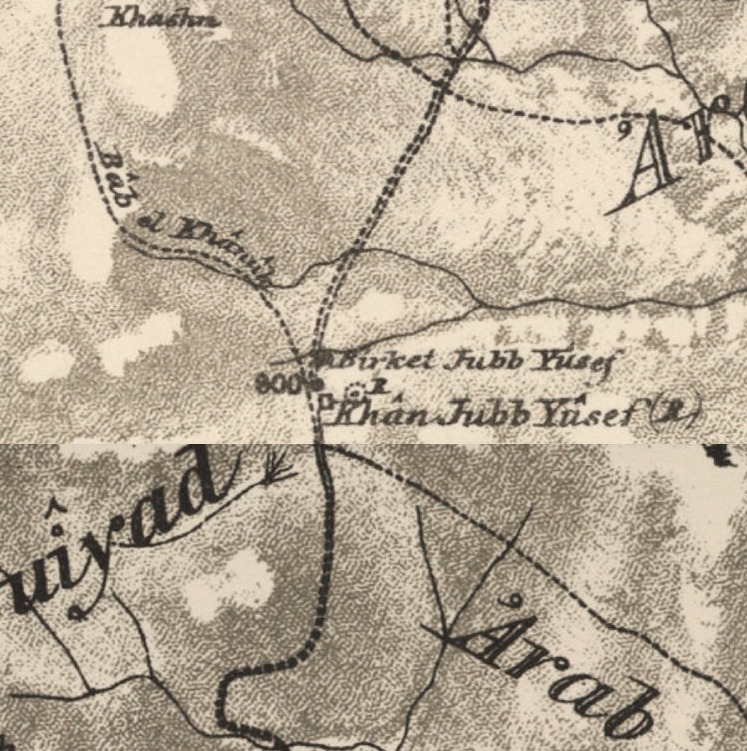
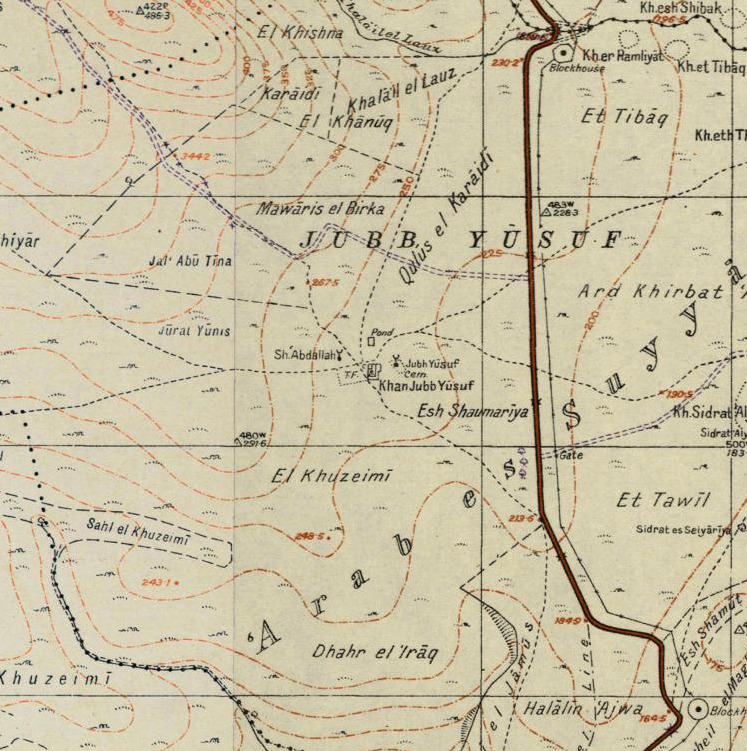
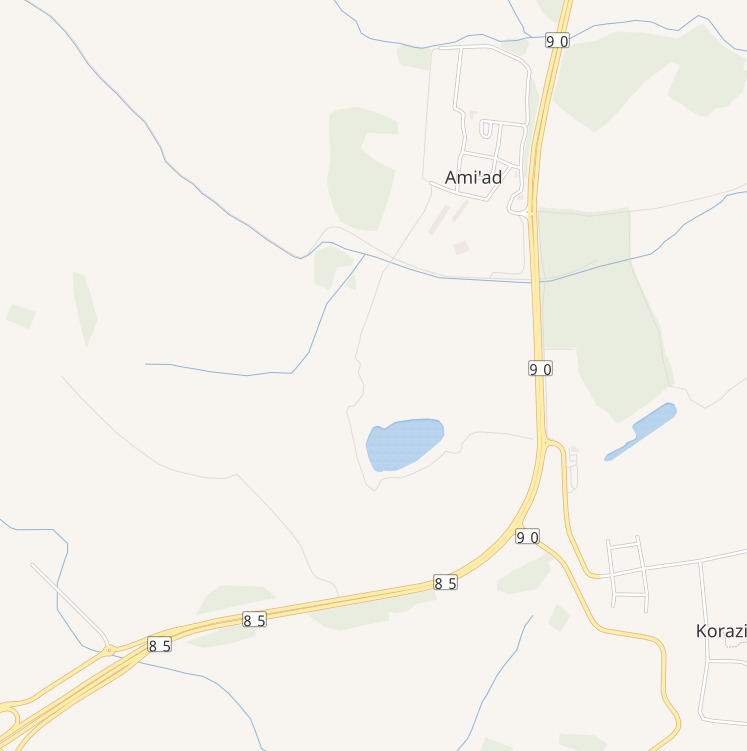
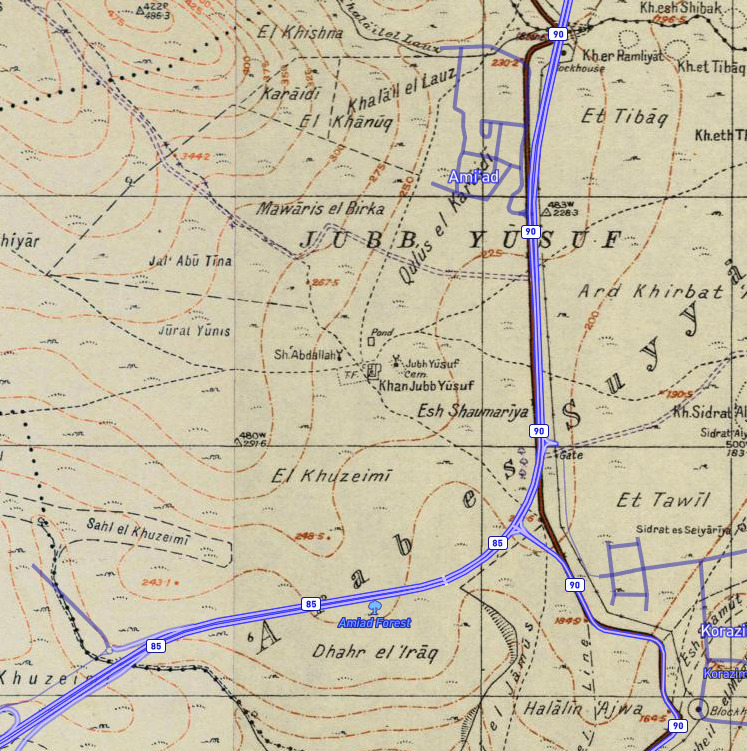
- 1870s map 1940s map modern map 1940s with modern overlay map A series of historical maps of the area around Jubb Yusuf (click the buttons)

- Location within Mandatory Palestine
- Coordinates: 32°55′09″N 35°32′13″E
- Palestine grid: 200/258
- Geopolitical entity: Mandatory Palestine
- Subdistrict: Safad

Area
  - Total: 11,325 dunams (11.325 km^{2}; 4.373 sq mi)

Population (1945)
  - Total: 170

Jubb Yusuf (Arabic: جُب يوسف), also called 'Arab al-Suyyad, was a Palestinian village depopulated in the 1948 Arab–Israeli War.

Situated in rocky terrain northwest of Lake Tiberias, the village was associated with a nearby well, Jubb Yussef (Joseph's Well), which was the site of a khan or caravan stopping place for centuries. The ruins are adjacent to the Israeli kibbutz of Ami'ad.

== History ==
=== Mamluk period ===
In 1440, at the time when Mamluks sultan Jaqmaq built a chain of khans in the country, it seems that Jubb Yussef was viewed as a holy place, where there may have been a small village near by, but no khan had been built there yet. Three decades later, in 1470, the Belgian traveller Anselm Adornes visited Jubb Yussef with his son Jan. Their travel report mentions "a beautiful inn which was built not long ago, a stone's throw away from the city".

=== Ottoman period ===
Following the Ottoman victory over the Mamluks at the Battle of Marj Dabiq in northern Syria in 1516, the army of Ottoman Sultan Selim I crossed into the Galilee and encamped at Jubb Yusuf before proceeding to conquer Mamluk Egypt. In the Ottoman tax registers of 1596, Jubb Yusuf is listed as a village in the nahiya ("subdistrict") of Jira, part of Safad Sanjak, with a population of 72. It paid taxes on crops such as wheat, barley, and fruit, and on goats and beehives. In the early 18th century the scholar and Sufi Abd al-Ghani al-Nabulsi mentioned the khan, the domed well which still exists, and a nearby mosque.

A map from Napoleon's invasion of 1799 by Pierre Jacotin showed the place, named as Puits de Joseph. The Swiss traveller Johann Ludwig Burckhardt observed during his visit around 1816 that the khan was falling into ruin. The mosque was dismantled around the beginning of the 19th century and the stones used to build a sheep fence close to the khan. The village by that time appears to have had few inhabitants, possibly because the well was no longer usable after the Galilee earthquake of 1837, leaving only one small, seasonal source of water nearby. An 1877 survey of the Galilee carried out by the Palestine Exploration Fund stated:

"… Our next camp was at Khan Jubb Yusuf, where we arrived on the 4th of April. The Khan is a large building falling into ruins on the main road to Damascus. There was no village near, the country being occupied by Bedawin of the Semakiyeh and Zenghariyeh tribes."

=== British Mandatory period ===
At the time of the 1931 census, Jubb Yusuf had 17 occupied houses and a population of 93 Muslims.

In 1946, when Kibbutz Ami'ad was established a few hundred meters north of the khan, the village was still inhabited by Bedouin families. According to an original member of the kibbutz, the pond still provided water part of the year, "and the Bedouins, whose tents were spread across the valley of Jubb Yussef, used it to water their flocks."

However, other described the village of Jubb Yusuf as small, with closely packed houses made of mud, basalt stones, and limestone. There were a large number of springs in the vicinity, and that had attracted the Bedouin of the 'Arab al-Suyyad tribe. They had settled the village, worked the land, and made up the majority of its (all Muslim) population. Their main crops were grain, vegetables, fruits, and olives. In 1944/45 they planted 2,477 dunums in cereals.

Due to the nomadic nature of the villagers the area under their jurisdiction was vast; 11,325 dunums.

==== 1947–48 civil war ====
Already in a report of 22 April 1948, Yigal Allon had recommended "an attempt to clear out the beduin encamped between the Jordan and Jubb Yusuf and the Sea of Galilee". On 4 May, Allon launched the Operation Broom (Operation Matateh). According to Khalidi, the residents of the village were probably expelled at that date.

Jubb Yusuf is mentioned as a location by the Arab Army of Liberation (ALA) commander Fawzi al-Qawuqji in his account of the war of 1948, and by Palmach commander Yigal Allon. In his report to the Haganah General Staff on 22 April, according to Israeli historian Benny Morris, Yigal Allon recommended "an attempt to clear out the beduins encamped between the Jordan [River], and Jubb Yusuf and the Sea of Galilee".

=== Israeli period ===
The Palestinian historian Walid Khalidi described the remains of the village in 1992: "All that remains of the village are the thorn-covered khan and domed tomb of Shaykh 'Abdallah. Fig and carob trees grow on the site. The village land is cultivated by the settlement of 'Ammi'ad. Near the site are structures belonging to the water project that diverts water from the Jordan for use in Israel, including the water pumping station at al-Tabigha (6 km to the south), which draws water from Lake Tiberias".

== See also ==
- Jubb Yussef (Joseph's Well)

== Bibliography ==
- Burckhardt, J.L. (1822). Travels in Syria and the Holy Land. London: J. Murray.
- Guérin, V. (1880). Description Géographique Historique et Archéologique de la Palestine (in French). Vol. 3: Galilee, pt. 1. Paris: L'Imprimerie Nationale.
- Hadawi, S. (1970). Village Statistics of 1945: A Classification of Land and Area ownership in Palestine. Palestine Liberation Organization Research Center.
- Hütteroth, W.-D.; Abdulfattah, K. (1977). Historical Geography of Palestine, Transjordan and Southern Syria in the Late 16th Century. Erlanger Geographische Arbeiten, Sonderband 5. Erlangen, Germany: Vorstand der Fränkischen Geographischen Gesellschaft. ISBN 3-920405-41-2.
- Karmon, Y. (1960). "An Analysis of Jacotin's Map of Palestine" (PDF). Israel Exploration Journal. 10 (3): 155–173, 244–253. Archived from the original (PDF) on 22 December 2019.
- Khalidi, W. (1992). All That Remains: The Palestinian Villages Occupied and Depopulated by Israel in 1948. Washington D.C.: Institute for Palestine Studies. ISBN 0-88728-224-5.
- Le Strange, G. (1890). Palestine Under the Moslems: A Description of Syria and the Holy Land from A.D. 650 to 1500. Committee of the Palestine Exploration Fund. (p.419, p.465, p.477, p.483, p.527, p.538)
- Mills, E., ed. (1932). Census of Palestine 1931. Population of Villages, Towns and Administrative Areas. Jerusalem: Government of Palestine.
- Morris, B. (2004). The Birth of the Palestinian Refugee Problem Revisited. Cambridge University Press. ISBN 978-0-521-00967-6.
- Pococke, R. (1811): A General Collection of the Best and Most Interesting Voyages and Travels in All Parts of the World: Many of which are Now First Translated Into English, (Popocke start at p. 406.)
- Petersen, Andrew (2001). A Gazetteer of Buildings in Muslim Palestine (British Academy Monographs in Archaeology). Vol. 1. Oxford University Press. ISBN 978-0-19-727011-0. pp. 45, 189
- al-Qawuqji, F. (1972): Memoirs of al-Qawuqji, Fauziin Journal of Palestine Studies
  - "Memoirs, 1948, Part I" in 1, no. 4 (Sum. 72): 27–58., pdf-file, downloadable
  - , pdf-file, downloadable
- Rhode, Harold (1979). The Administration and Population of the Sancak of Safad in the Sixteenth Century (PhD). Columbia University.
