= Jubb Yussef (Joseph's Well) =

Archaeological site in Israel

Coordinates: 32°55′10″N 35°32′13″E

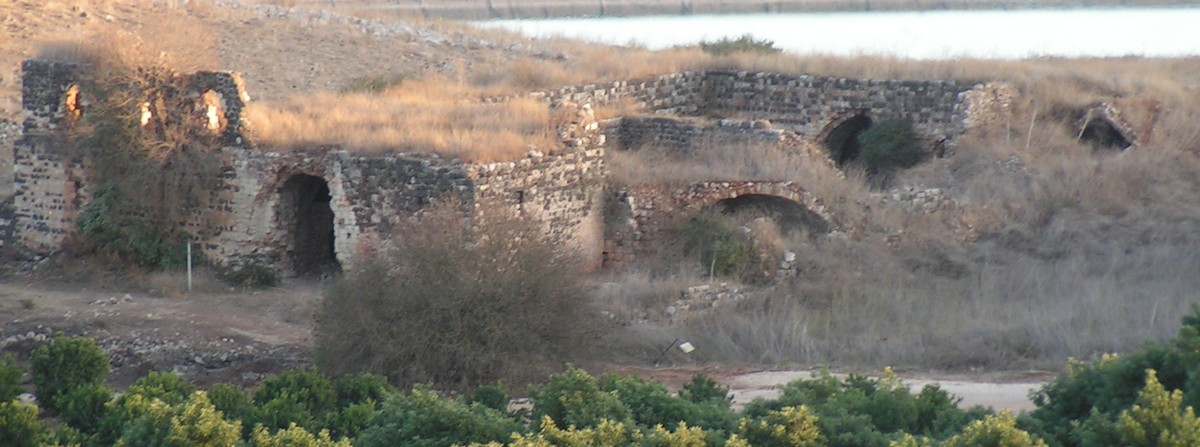
The khan at Jubb Yussef from northwest, 2007

Jubb Yussef (Arabic: جُبّ يُوسُف, Hebrew: גוב יוסף), also known as "Joseph's Well" in English, is an archaeological site in Ramat Korazim in Galilee, Israel. It is believed by Muslims to be the site of the pit into which Yusuf (Joseph), a figure which is part of both the Biblical and Quranic narratives, was thrown by his brothers.

== Name, location and tradition ==
Jubb Yussef is located near Ami'ad in the Galilee, altitude 246 meters, at the western side of a rocky hill (datum point 2006.2583). Jubb means cistern or well in Arabic, and its cognate in Christian Palestinian Aramaic is gubba, and Yussef is the Arabic form for Joseph.

The well consists of a dug-out pit with a diameter of one metre and depth of about four metres, roofed by a cupola supported by four pillars and surrounded by ancient graves.

=== Biblical narrative ===
According to the biblical story (Genesis 37:12–23), Joseph was sent from Hebron by his father Jacob, to his brothers who tended sheep in Shechem (Tell Balata near Nablus). When he arrived there he learned that his brothers had moved on to Dothan, where he then caught up with them. The distance from Shechem to Dothan is not mentioned, nor is the distance from Hebron to Shechem, but it is customary to associate Dothan with Tel Dothan, located between Shechem and Jenin. After throwing him into the pit, his brothers sold Joseph to a caravan of Midianites on its way to Egypt (Genesis 37:25–28).

=== Quranic narrative ===
In the Quran, Jubb Yussef is mentioned in two verses: Surah 12 verses 10 and 15. Verse 10 says that one of the brothers of Joseph opposed killing him, and said it would be better to throw him into the bottom of a pit (jubb), so that one of caravans could take him from there. Verse 15 says that when Joseph was cast into the pit, God told him that he would one day remind his brothers of this incident.

== History ==
=== Overview ===
The site served as a crossroads on the Via Maris linking Egypt (Cairo), Syria (Damascus), and Mesopotamia. From the 10th century onward, it is mentioned as a landmark, a holy place, and a source of water for caravans. From the 13th century there was a settlement in the area, which is mentioned up to the 17th century. At the end of the 16th century, a small khan or caravanserai was built there, which is notable for its solid construction and state of preservation compared to other khans from the same period.

Jubb Yussef is mentioned in the middle of the 10th century but the current structure is of a later period. According to travellers, the well, which was 10 meters deep, held good drinking water up until the 19th century. Afterwards, due perhaps to the Galilee earthquake of 1837, the pit collapsed and was no longer cited as a water source. According to 19th-century visitors, the well and cupola were located in a quadrangle alongside a small mosque.

=== Early Muslim period ===
The Muslim commentators disagree over the location of the pit. Some place it in Jerusalem, while others say it was in "Syria". The mid-10th century geographer Al-Istakhari placed the pit in the Galilee, which was more likely than between Sangil and Shechem. This was the common tradition from the 10th century onward, to the point that Jubb Yussef served as a geographical landmark in the region: Qudamah of Bagdad, who lived during the first half of the 10th century, mentions Jubb Yussef as a location between Kfar Leila and Tiberias. Al-Muqaddasi supplements further details in 985, and also mentions Jubb Yussef as a landmark and to note distances to different destinations.

=== Crusaders, Ayyubids, and Mamluks ===
In the 12th and 13th century, the Crusaders accepted the Muslim narrative but since the Bible states that the pit is located in Dothan, they named the region Dothan.

More detailed descriptions of Jubb Yussef can be found in Arab sources. In 1189, Saladin passed by on his way to the siege of Acre. In 1225, Yaqut al-Hamawi writes:

Jubb Yussef, the hole into which his brothers cast him, which Allah mentioned in his precious book (the Koran), and is located in Urdan (in the Galilee), between Banias and Tiberias, 12 miles from Tiberias on the way to Damascus. So said Istakhari (951 CE), and others say that Jacob lived in Shechem in Palestine, and the pit into which Joseph was cast is between Kfar Makhparia, called Sangil, and between Shechem...

The Mamluks fortified the road from Egypt to Damascus and built khans and forts along the way. In 1440, Mamluk sultan Jaqmaq built a chain of khans in the country, among others Khan el-Minya in Tabgha, and the khan by the Bnot Yaacov Bridge. The distance between these two khans is one day's walk for a caravan. It seems that Jubb Yussef was viewed as a holy place at that time, and there may have been a small village near it, but the khan had not yet been built. Thirty years later, in 1470, the Belgian traveller Anselme Adorno visited Jubb Yussef with his son Jan. He called it "a beautiful inn which was built not long ago, a stone's throw away from the city".

During the Mamluk period, the area apparently enjoyed prosperity and the khan was built. Safed and Gaza were important cities at the time. Unlike Gaza, which was located on the main coastal road and near the seashore, Safed was a mountain city, which served as the capital of a district - the Mamlakat Safad. Its status as an official station under the authority of Safed is also apparent from later documents, showing that there was a station for collecting toll fees, manned by a military unit.

=== Ottoman period ===
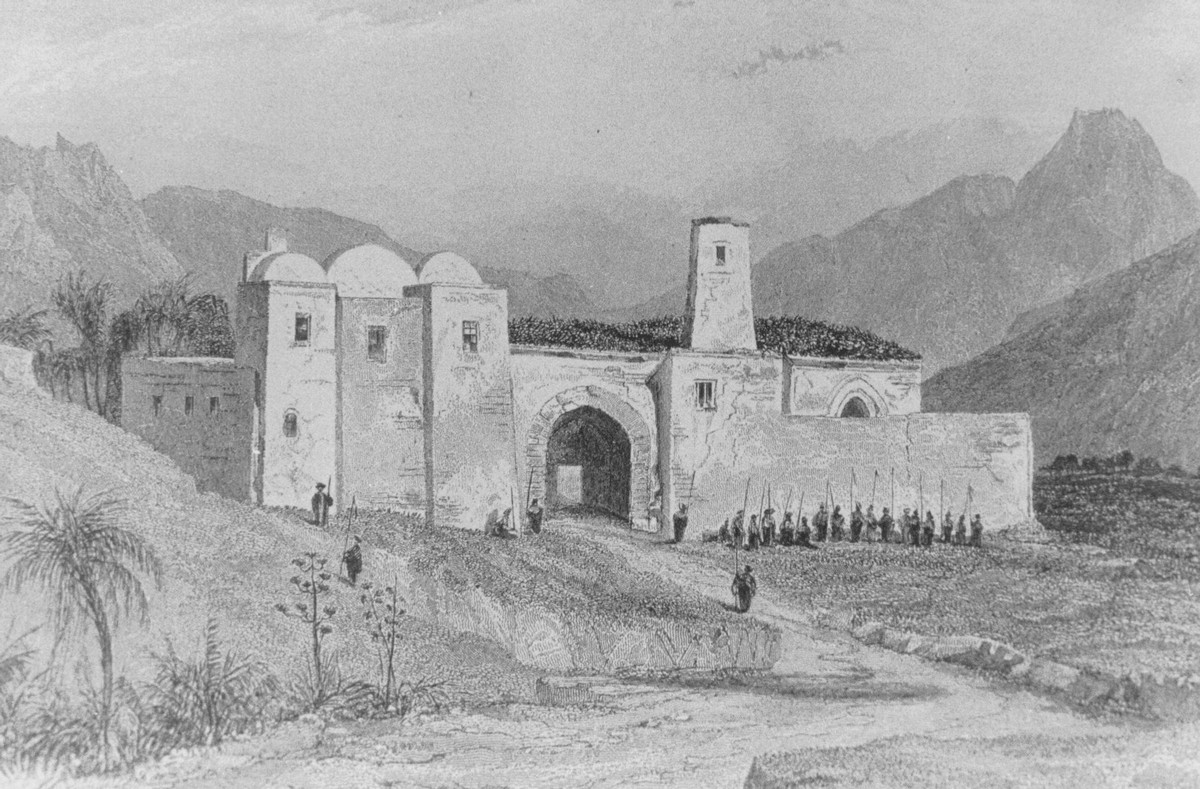
Sketch by Baron Taylor, 1839

From the Ottoman period, there was a settlement at this location, presumably non-military. In the Ottoman tax registers of 1596, Jubb Yusuf is listed as a village with a population of 72, which paid taxes on crops, goats and beehives.

== Travellers' descriptions ==
The first detailed account of Jubb Yussef and the khan comes from the Italian traveller Aquilante Rocchetta in 1599, who describes a quadrangle with a water pit in its centre. He recounts his meeting with processions of eastern Christians, which apparently performed a special ritual there that was related to Joseph. Rocchetta also writes about a domed structure built on marble pillars above the pit, and about ruins east of the pit, which he identified as "the house of Jacob our Father". Usually the few pilgrims who arrived here did not spend the night but proceeded to the next station at the Bnot Yaakov Bridge Khan, or to Safed. Their descriptions are brief and similar to Rocchetta's. They described the khan as dilapidated and noted that the pit was located in a quadrangle next to a small mosque. Sometimes they recounted the Joseph legend and cited the holiness of the place.

In March 1799, Jubb Yussef was mentioned in the context of the siege of Acre. Napoleon learned that Turkish units were crossing the Bnot Yaakov Bridge (Jisr Ya’aqub in Arabic) on their way from Damascus to Safed and sent an army under the command of General Mira to the area. The first battle took place near Safed on 31 March, the second one by the Bnot Yaakov Bridge on April 2. Units of the "geographical engineering corps" under the command of M. Jacotin were sent together with the French army, and this is the source of the first modern maps of the country.

General Mira led his troops to Safed through Ramah, Kafr 'Inan, Ramat Pishchor (near the current day hospital) – and not through Jubb Yussef, so that the mapping of the area is not perfect, but still of interest. In the Jacoutin's map, which was drawn during this journey, Jubb Yussef ("Puits de Joseph") is noted as a crossroads. The khan does not appear on the map, though it had existed at the time. Other khans such as Khan el-Minya and the khan at the Jacob's Daughters Bridge are noted on the map. It seems that despite being located on a main road, the importance of Jubb Yussef is secondary.

The first traveller to offer a detailed architectural account of the site was Burckhardt (1812):

As there is no khan for travellers at Szaffad, and I had no letters to any person in the town, I was obliged to lodge at the public coffee house. We left the town early in the morning, and descended the side of the mountain towards the lake; here the ground is for the greater part uncultivated and without trees. At two hours and a quarter is khan Djob Yousef, or the khan of Joseph's Well, situated in a narrow plain. The khan is falling rapidly into ruin; near it is a large Birket. Here is shewn the well into which Joseph was let down by his brothers; it is in a small court-yard by the side of the Khan, is about three feet in diameter, and at least thirty feet deep. I was told that the bottom is hewn in the rock: its sides were well lined with masonry as far as I could see into it, and the water never dries up, a circumstance which makes it difficult to believe that this was the well into which Joseph was thrown. The whole of the mountain in the vicinity is covered with large pieces of black stone; but the main body of the rock is calcareous. The country people relate that the tears of Jacob dropping upon the ground while he was in search of his son turned the white stones black, and they in consequence call these stones Jacob's tears. Joseph's well is held in veneration by Turks as well as Christians; the former have a small chapel just by it, and caravan travellers seldom pass here without saying a few prayers in honour of Yousef. The khan is on the great road from Akka to Damascus. It is inhabited by a dozen Moggrebyn soldiers, with their families, who cultivate the fields near it.

This is the first description which definitely confirms that this is indeed the pit we know today. In spite of the location of the pit – on a hill – it has water at a depth of about 10 metres. Burckhardt is not the only one to mention this fact, and we can assume that this was the case at least until the year 1837, the time of the great earthquake of Safed which probably caused the collapse of the well.

The road from Acre to Damascus (and not the traditional "Via Maris") is related to the reign of Suleiman Pasha, in the Galilee and Damascus. Suleiman Pasha was the successor of Jazzar Pasha, who successfully protected his city Acre from the army of Napoleon. The aforementioned Maghrebi soldiers were part of the North African mercenary army, which Jazzar and Suleiman brought to the country to protect their reign.

The many travellers which had been in the area in the 19th century often mention Jubb Yussef, but they usually do not add details beyond the comprehensive account by Burckhardt, which is often quoted in their writings.

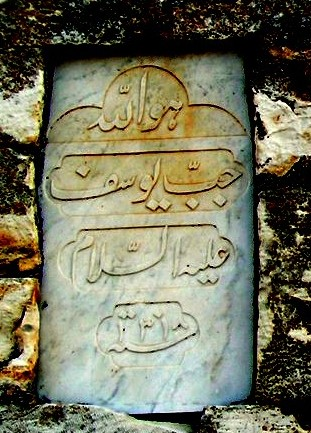
The plaque, written in Urdu script, was added in 1900

The British survey of Palestine in the year 1875, which was conducted by the Palestine Exploration Fund, is the first to present the plans of the khan. In their book, they write:

"... It (the khan) was built on the Damascus road at the same time the khan El Miniah, Khan el Tujjar and others were built. It is still in very good condition and serves as a resting spot for merchants passing through. The halls, which are curved and long, are used for pack beasts. There are also some modest resting areas, and prayer areas".

The assertion of the archaeologists at the time, that the khan was in "very good condition" – despite its west wing already lying in ruins – is relative. It seems that according to their terms, a building whose walls were still intact, and even had curved halls and parts of a second floor, was considered to be in "very good condition".

The survey mentions the praying areas in the khan, but the court around the pit and its mosque apparently did not exist. It appears they had been ruined in the earthquake at the beginning of 1837, and its remains were used to build the sheepfold, which is still adjacent to the eastern wall of the khan. The court surrounding the pit is still mentioned one year after the earthquake, but it is possible that at this time one could still make out the remains of the court, and the sheepfold was built later on. Today, all that is left of the court and mosque are only remnants of their foundations, and the origins of these remnants are dubious.

In the year 1900 a philanthropist, apparently of Indian origin, came to Jubb Yussef, and set a marble plaque on the domed structure above the pit, on which was engraved:

In the name of Allah
Pit of Joseph
May he rest in peace
1318

The first line is written in Urdu script. The year 1318 according to the Hijra, is AD 1900. This moment of grace did not prevent the site's continued deterioration.

== The khan ==
The khan is located approximately 80 metres west of Jubb Yussef, on the western side of a rocky hill. A pathway, partially carved in stone, connects between the two.

=== Layout ===
The khan is a rectangular structure (34 x 47 metres) enclosing a courtyard (16 × 22 metres). This is one of the smallest khans in the country. The walls of the building, built of alternating layers of limestone and basalt, are extremely thick, between 1.5 and 2.8 metres. There are openings shaped like shooting slits, which likely served as lighting and ventilation openings, because their size and opening angles would not enable them to be used for shooting.

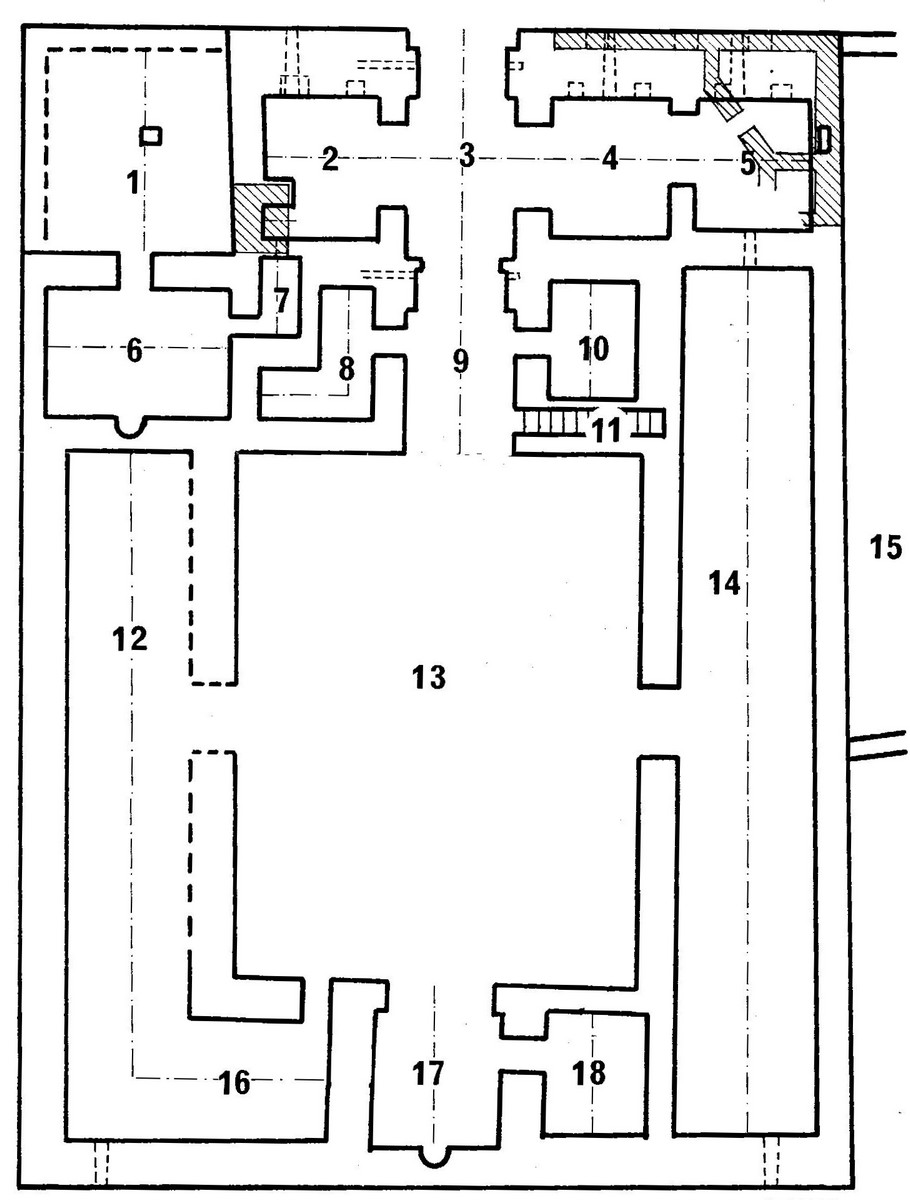
Floorplan of the khan – click to enlarge

The building consists of one floor, except for parts of its northern wing, where four bed chambers and a watchtower were built on the second floor (shaded in the floor plan). The gate is located on the northern side, and a 17-metre long passageway leads from the gate to the courtyard (No. 3 and 9 in the floor plan). On the eastern side of the passageway there is a stairway (No. 11) adjacent to the courtyard which leads to the roof of the building and the second floor. Along the sides of the courtyard (No. 13) are two long domed halls (No. 12 – 6 × 28 metres on the west side, and No. 14 – 6 × 35 metres on the east side) which run along the sides of the structure.

On the southern side of the courtyard, the architectural continuation of the gate and opposite from it a room is located (No. 17, 5 × 5.5 metres), which has a praying alcove (mihrab). On the eastern side of this chamber, between it and a long hall is another room (No. 18, 4 × 5 metres). There are two more similar rooms on the other side of the courtyard, on both sides of the hallway (No. 8 and No. 10).

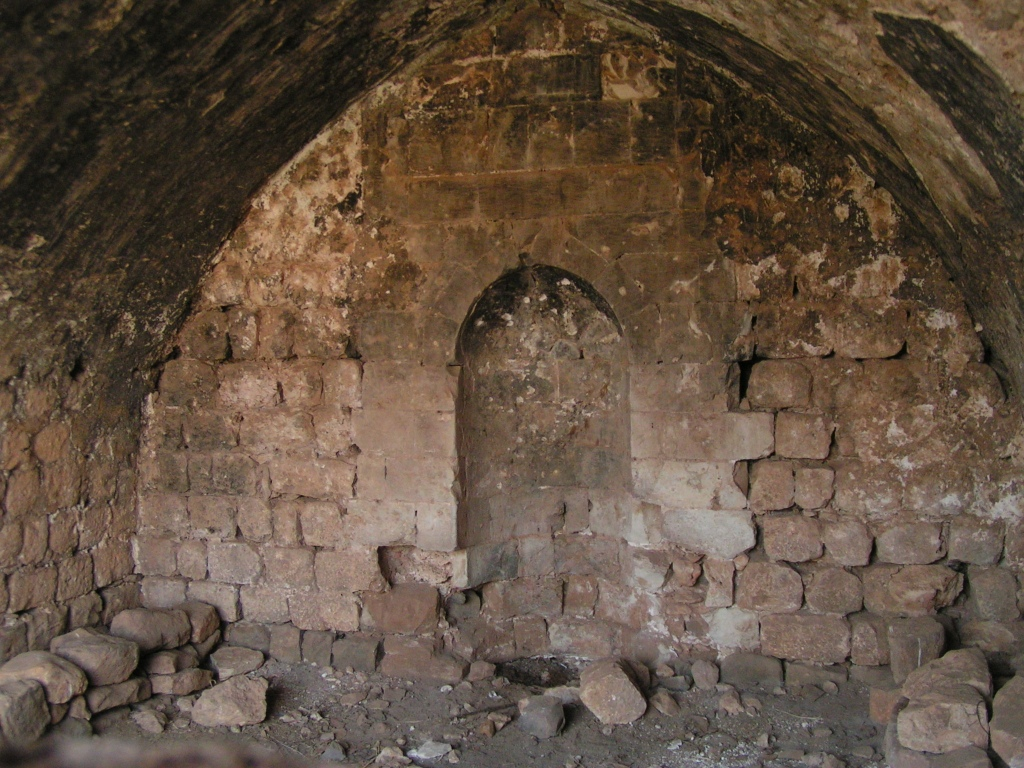
The mihrab in Room 17

There are more halls in the northern side of the northern wing, probably a later addition to the original building. One of them (No. 4 and 5, 6 × 11 metres) on the eastern side, and the other one (No. 2, 5 × 6 metres) on the western side of the hallway. These halls have more of the openings similar to shooting slits, and more niches which were apparently intended for storage. There is also a fireplace in room No. 5 with a chimney going up through the second floor, and an additional fireplace in one of the niches.

In the northwest corner of the khan, further to these halls, there is a water cistern (No. 1), which used to be surrounded by a wall. Access to the cistern was probably only via the building, through a room to the south of the cistern, which had an additional, somewhat improvised praying area, which is also simpler than the extravagant mihrab in the southern wing (No. 6, 5 × 7 metres).

The cistern is 8 metres by 8 metres and its depth in the present day is 2.3 metres. The bottom part has been carved out of the rock, while its upper part is constructed of stones and most of it has been plastered. The cistern's construction is of high quality. It has a roof made of basalt slabs on top of well-built arches. The content of the water hole is 130 cubic metres. According to travelers, it provided modest amounts of water to the caravans passing through. Even today, though the collecting ducts are ruined, the bottom of the cistern still has water even at the end of summer. It is possible that the bottom part of the cistern is on an aquifer, and water slowly drains into it. The existence of an aquifer could explain the presence of water at the bottom of Jubb Yussef at a depth of 10 metres, as witnessed by Burckhardt and others, even though it is located 110 metres away from the hole. Jubb Yussef is located higher up on the hill, and it seems that the bottom of both holes is on the same level. The assumption that the origin of the water is from a spring and not from drained rainwater is supported by the high quality of the water, as stated by the travellers.

=== Adjacent courtyard ===
A rectangular courtyard of about half a dunam is adjacent to the eastern wing of the khan, which apparently served as a sheepfold at a later period.

=== Current state ===
The khan has been described as being in a state of ruin for almost 200 years, and it seems that it has survived in part only due to its solid construction. Without further reconstruction work, the khan is destined to disappear. In 1985 the remainder of the arch at the gate collapsed. A comparison of the khan in its present state to pictures taken about 1940 shows clearly that it is deteriorating.

The building is well kept and nearly intact except for the western wing, which lies in ruins, and parts of the eastern wing. This is impressive considering the "dry" construction of the khan (i.e., no mortar to bind the blocks together), and its location in the Jordan Rift Valley, an area prone to earthquakes. Throughout the existence of the khan there were two earthquakes: one in 1759, in which half of the Jews of Safed perished, and the second one in 1837, which was even stronger. It is possible that the partial ruin of the khan was caused by these earthquakes.

=== Historical mentions of the khan ===
There is no historical documentation of the date of the building, but there is some evidence indicating construction in the second half of the 13th century. Based on historical sources and literature of the pilgrims, the khan may be dated to the time of Sultan Inal (1461–1467), during the early 1460s. 20 years earlier Sultan Jaqmak had built a chain of khans, but the historical sources don't mention the Jubb Yussef Khan, which is also different in style from the other khans. We do know that Sultan Inal and Sultan Qaitbay (1468–1495) built many public and religious buildings.

The Belgian traveller Adorno first describes the khan in the year 1470 as a recently completed building. Five year later, Sultan Qaitbay passed through the region on his way from Safed to Damascus. Despite the fact that the road from Safed to Damascus passes through Jubb Yussef, Abu Jian, who accompanied Qaitbay and describes their journeys, does not mention the khan, even though it had been in existence for 5 years at that time. It is possible that he avoided mentioning the khan because it had not been built by his master.

It seems that the khan had been originally built as halls and rooms surrounding an internal courtyard, without the northern part of the northern wing. In the year 1674 it is mentioned that there was an engraving in the gate. Nothing remains of it. It seems that between this date and the earthquake of 1759, an addition to the northern wing was built. This addition, whose arches are in an east–west orientation, different from the rest of the building's arches. There is no direct documentation about the building of this addition, and certainly no information about the date it was built. But there are several architectural clues which indicate that this is an add-on: The change of the orientation of the arches, openings in the original structure which had been walled-in by the new addition, the different nature of the building, and the construction of the second storey exactly above this area are all evidence that this is a later addition.

As to the time this addition was built, there is very little information to shed light on it. If there had indeed been an engraving in the gate which was visible in 1674, it is reasonable to assume that it was covered over by the new building. In the year 1810, at the time between the two earthquakes, the khan is already described as partially in ruin, perhaps following the quake of 1759. Those who built the addition must have repaired the ruins of the long western hall, because it wouldn't have made sense to build a fancy addition over a ruined structure. And indeed, its construction is of better quality than the rest of the khan. Most of it is built over a ruined structure. When this addition was being built, an opening was made between the roof of the cistern, which is surrounded by a wall, to the room to the southern side of it, and a machrab was built in it. Access to the water hole was probably from within the khan, through this room only. There are several protruding stones on this wall, which may be the remains of a staircase, but in the drawing by Baron Taylor from 1839, the wall appears intact without any opening.

In Baron Taylor's drawing, which dates two years after the quake of 1837, the khan appears with its second floor intact and the cistern is still surrounded by a wall. We must carefully consider the date of this drawing, which is based on a print from the year 1817. The landscape in the background, which is inconsistent with the reality of the area, further calls its authenticity into question. The eastern sheepfold is not to be seen in this picture, and is likewise unmentioned by the British survey plan from the year 1875. It is possible that the sheepfold had not yet been built at the time, or that the surveyors didn't consider it important. Indeed, this sheepfold has little importance apart from being mostly built from hewn stone. This could explain the almost complete disappearance of the courtyard that surrounded Jubb Yussef for hundreds of years and which was about 60 metres away from the enclosure.

== Jubb Yussef and the Via Maris ==
Kibbutz Ami'ad is located today on the major road leading from the north of Israel to its centre. In the past, it was first and foremost the topographical nature of the area which dictated that the main road pass through here. This road, known today as the Via Maris or sometimes as "The Way of Egypt," connected Syria and Assyria to Egypt, and was one of the most important roads in the Fertile Crescent. The road along the sea, which is the natural way these days, was then difficult for passage because of the swamps of the Sharon plain, Mount Carmel, and the "Ladder of Tyre", which prevented convenient passage in the area of Rosh Hanikra.

Via Maris has changed little over the last thousands of years. The importance of this road, like that of other roads, changed according to the rise and fall of different powers in the region. Whenever the reigning government was stronger and more centralised, it required more transportation and communications routes, in order to transfer armies and for commerce. Indeed, since the Roman empire and even before that, the khans were necessary especially when the local population was sparse, with few settlements to provide services for the caravans. On the ruins of the Persian and Byzantine empires, the Arabs enforced their language and their religion within a few decades, and erected an enormous empire which reigned over the region from Spain to central Asia. Naturally, such an empire required proper transportation routes. These routes were often described by Muslim geographers, one of the most prominent of them being Al-Muqaddasi, who also mentioned Jubb Yussef. In one place Al-Muqaddasi and others detail the distances between the khans, which is one day's travel of a caravan (about 37 km), which is about 6 hours of walking at the rate of about 6 km per hour (3 Arab miles).

In 1440, Sultan Jaqmaq built many khans along Via Maris, among them Khan al-Tujjar, Khan el-Minya, and the khan by the Daughters of Jacob Bridge (Gesher Bnot Ya'akov/Jisr Benat Ya'kub).

In 1577, the governor of Damascus sent a complaint to his superiors, that there were not enough postal horses on the route between Damascus and Egypt. In order to fulfill the requirements of the official messengers, horses were being confiscated, which were returned to their owners 10 days later, or not at all - an injustice to the local population. Following the complaint, it was decided to station three horses at each of the khans: Sasa, Quneitra, Bnot Yaacov Bridge, Minya, Lajjun, Qaqun, Ras al-Ayn, Gaza and El Arish. On this list, Khan al-Tujjar is missing, as well as some stations between Ramleh and Gaza, and between Gaza and El-Arish. It is possible that postal horses were already stationed at Khan al-Tujjar, which was a large and central khan, and also in Khan Bidres in Beit Daras, and in Khan Yunes. Khan Jubb Yussef is not mentioned at the time in relation to postal horses, since it was not necessary to change horses between the Bnot Yaacov Bridge khan and Khan Minya.

If the need to build Khan Jubb Yussef as a roadside station along Via Maris was therefore not decisive, what was the khan's purpose? In a letter to the governor of Egypt in 1560 there are some hints of bribery given to the officer of military units bringing taxes from Egypt. Jubb Yussef is mentioned as a Sultan-owned region where toll fees are paid to the Sultan. From the year 1596, there is a list of 13 tax-paying families living at Jubb Yussef. These taxes were also paid to the Sultan and not to a regional ruler or local feudal lord. This fact indicates that Jubb Yussef was an imperial stronghold of significance to the kingdom.

Jubb Yussef was an important crossroad, mainly due to the roads which led to Safed. Since the main roads did not go through Safed, we may assume that Jubb Yussef served as a "station" of Safed along the main roads. Imperial caravans passing through this way were provisioned by the governor of Safed, at Jubb Yussef.

=== Religious site ===
The various writings stress the religious value of the site throughout the centuries. Near the Pit of Joseph there was a mosque, and in the khan itself there are two additional prayer rooms. Some travellers mention special praying rituals of Muslims and Christians related to the saintly Joseph.

== Related ruins ==
=== The Pond of Jubb Yussef ===
This is a seasonal water pond (30 x 30 metres), built of simple materials, located about 80 metres north of the khan. It collects water from the small wadi at the foot of the khan. Many travellers mention this pond, while others ignore it, just as it is marked on some maps and not on others. This is possibly due to the seasonal nature of the pond. To this day, it still gathers water during rainy years.

=== Grave of Sheikh Abdallah ===
This is a grave in the centre of the valley, under an ancient oak tree, 120 metres west of the khan, and 240 metres west of Jubb Yussef. Only the oak remains, because the grave, which had never been especially grand, served at the time of the establishment of Amiad as a hill for gathering stones from the fields. The grave is first mentioned by Richard Pococke in the year 1745 and is marked as such in maps from the Mandate period.

=== The House of Our Father Jacob ===
The House of Jacob Our Father is first mentioned by Don Aquilante Rocchetta, the Italian traveller who visited the region in 1599. He describes the ruins to the east of Jubb Yussef and quotes the locals who called it by this name. This is an area of about 10 dunams (about one hectare), clear of rocks, with Jubb Yussef located at its western side. Today only the foundations of the buildings are visible. According to ceramic evidence, this was essentially a one-period settlement, which existed in the second half of the 13th century.

It is difficult to tell for sure whether this settlement was established by the crusaders at the end of their sovereignty of this part of the Galilee, or whether it was built by the Mamluks at the onset of their power. In the early 1240s, the Templars laboured mightily to build the Safed fortress, their largest and most formidable in the Middle East. This was their second fortress in the region. The earlier one, built 100 years before, had been much smaller, and was abandoned when they left at the end of the 12th century. In 1266, the fortress of Safed was conquered by Sultan Baybars. Thousands of citizens and defenders that inhabited the fortress were slaughtered after surrendering their weapons, mistakenly believing their enemy's promise that if they did so, they would be peacefully evicted to Tyre.

Later on, the area was related to the strengthening of the Mamluk sovereignty in the land. The first sultans, Baybars, Qalawun and Al-Malik al-Nasir Muhammad often built and restored public and religious buildings, such as Nebi Musa near Jericho, various buildings on the Temple Mount, and near the Cave of the Patriarchs, a mosque in Safed, and the bridge near Lod, Jisr al-Jindas, all of which are still in existence. These sultans also built shelters for pilgrims (ribat) in and around Jerusalem. Possibly, the settlement in Jubb Yussef was also built as part of these efforts, and was intended in part to provide services for pilgrims, as is customary in the vicinity of holy sites. Burckhardt describes Jubb Yussef (or Dothan, as it appears in his writings) at this time as a fine-looking town, full of vines, fig and olive trees and pastures. There are no remnants of any other settlement in the area except for the one on the hill, and the description as a "town", which may be interpreted in various ways, does not necessarily indicate the size of the settlement. It is therefore not unreasonable to believe that Burckhardt was referring to this site. In the year 1321, Marino Sanuto made a similar description, probably without having visited the site himself. Five years later, Ibn Battuta passes through the area and describes a well and a mosque in the yard, but does not mention the settlement. It is possible that the settlement did exist, but Ibn Battuta, an experienced geographer, chose to describe the unique features of the place, without placing much importance on the settlement itself.

== See also ==
- Jubb Yusuf
- Archaeology of Israel and Levantine archaeology
- Barid, Muslim postal network renewed during Mamluk period (roads, bridges, khans)
- Bir Ma'in, Arab village near Ramle, connected by a foundation legend to Jacob/Ya'kub and Daughters of Jacob Bridge/Jisr Benat Ya'kub.
- Daughters of Jacob Bridge on the Jordan, associated with biblical Jacob due to a misunderstanding
- Jacob's Well, site associated with biblical Jacob in Samaritan and Christian tradition
