= Tel Dothan =

Biblical city and archaeological site

Coordinates: 32°24′48.70″N 35°14′23.50″E

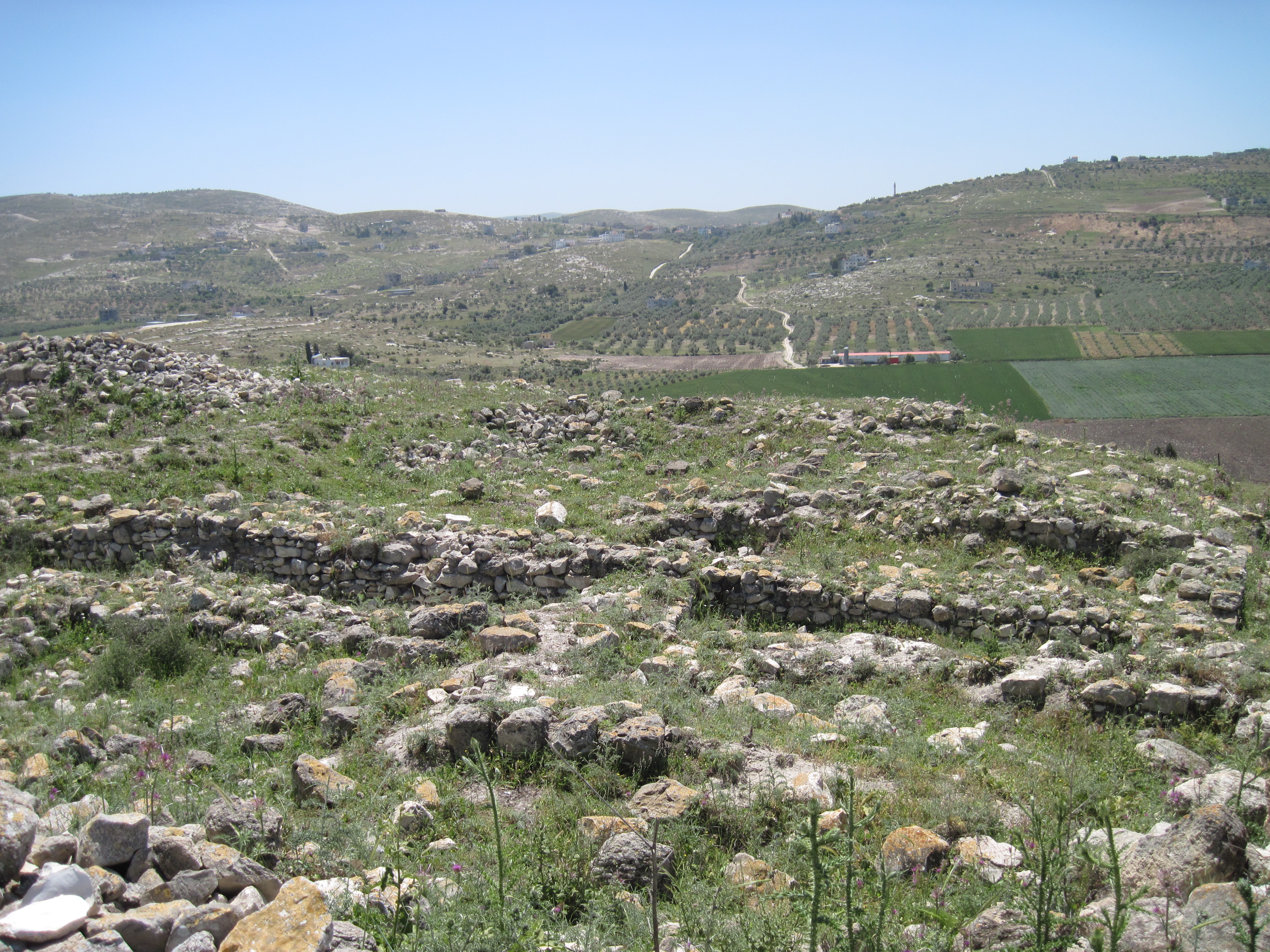
Tel Dothan

Dothan (Hebrew: דֹתָן) (also Dotan) is a location mentioned twice in the Hebrew Bible. It has been identified with Tell Dothan (Arabic: تل دوثان), also known as Tell al-Hafireh, located adjacent to the Palestinian town of Bir al-Basha, and ten kilometers (driving distance) southwest of Jenin in the West Bank, near Dotan Junction of Route 60.

== Identification ==
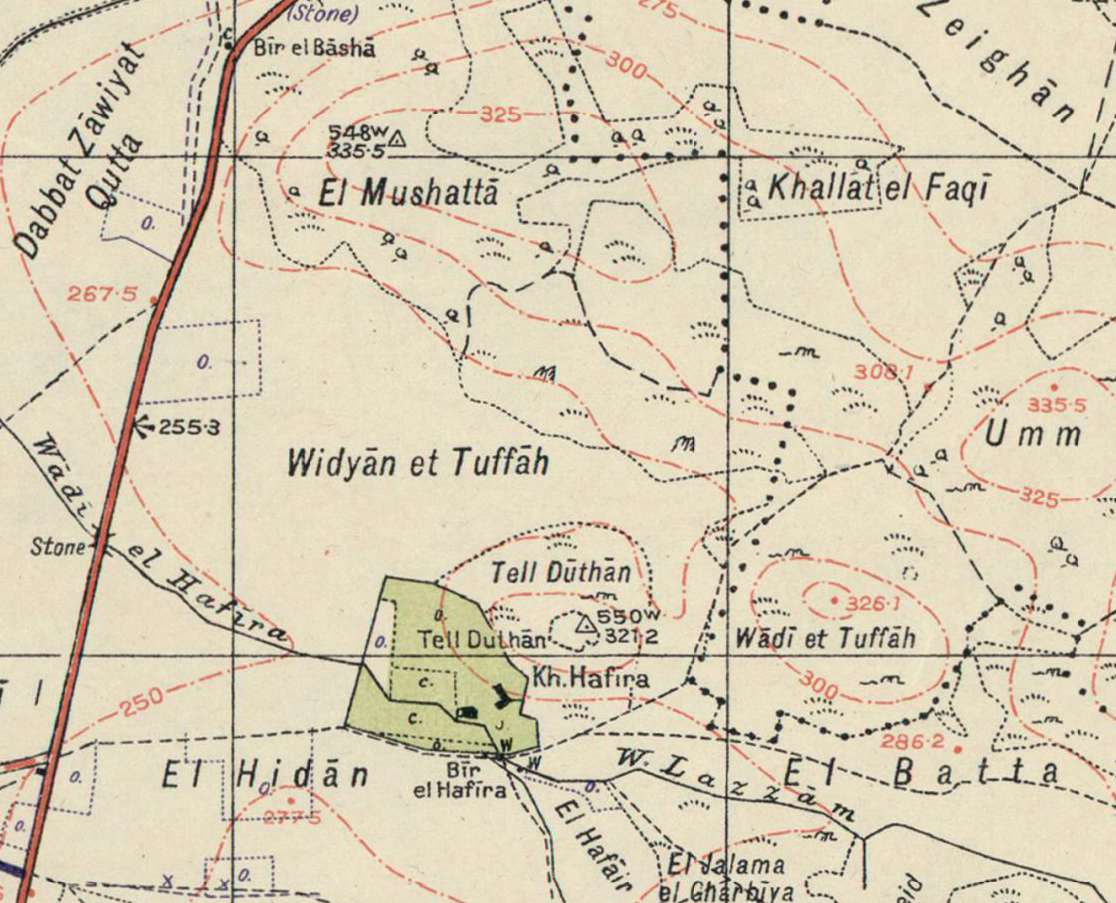
1940s Survey of Palestine map of the area

The modern consensus is that the archaeological site of Tell Dothan corresponds to ancient Dothan.

Eusebius places Dothan 12 miles to the north of Sebaste; broadly consistent with the modern location.

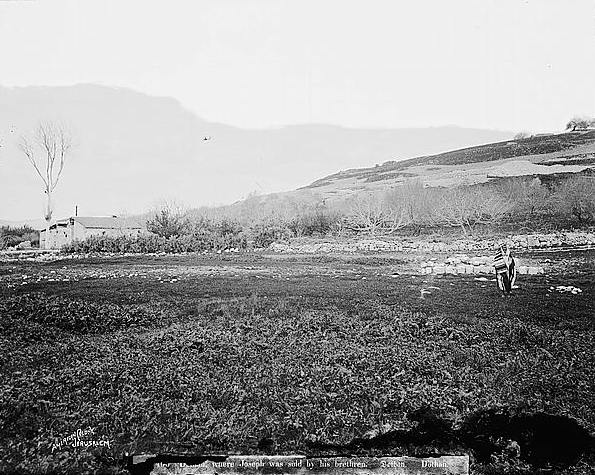
View of Tel Dothan

=== Other proposed locations ===
Van de Velde noted that the Crusaders and later medieval travelers had located Dothan at the village of Hittin.

== Hebrew Bible ==
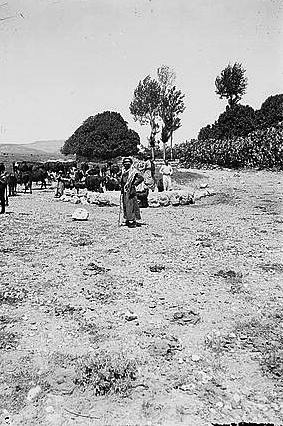
Northern views: Joseph's Well at Dothan

Dothan is first mentioned in the Hebrew Bible (in the Book of Genesis) in connection with the history of Joseph, as the place in which the sons of Jacob (Israel) had moved their sheep to pasture them. The biblical narrative refers to cisterns or pits in the locality, into which the brothers dropped Joseph to hide him. Later, at the suggestion of Judah, the brothers rescued him from the pits and sold him to some passing Ishmaelite merchants.

Dothan later appears as the residence of Elisha (Second Book of Kings, 2 Kings 6:13) and the scene of a vision of chariots and horses of fire surrounding the mountain on which the city stood.

A plain near Dothan is also mentioned in the apocryphal Book of Judith.

== History ==
=== Neolithic and Chalcolithic ===
The earliest remains from the site come from the Neolithic and Chalcolithic period.

=== Early Bronze Age ===
Tel Dothan was occupied in the Early Bronze.

Tel Dothan, located near Jenin (10 km) in the West Bank, was a heavily fortified Canaanite city during the Early Bronze Age I-III (c. 3700–2300 BC).

Tel Dothan was in a network with other EBA cities as Megiddo (west), Taanakh (west) and Tell el-Farah North (east).

By Early Bronze IV (c. 2350-2000 BCE) the site is abandoned until Middle Bronze IIB.

=== Middle Bronze Age ===
==== Middle Bronze I ====
In the Middle Bronze I (c. 2000-1800 BCE), the site was abandoned.

==== Middle Bronze II ====
Following the occupation of the Early Bronze Age III, Dothan was abandoned and did not reemerge until the Middle Bronze IIB. The site was occupied from about 1750 until around 1450 B.C.

In Middle Bronze IIB (MB IIB) there are two layers.

=== Late Bronze Age ===
==== Late Bronze I ====
Surviving the initial collapse of the Middle Bronze Age and persisting into Late Bronze I (c. 1450 BCE), during the time of Thutmose III of Egypt attacking nearby Megiddo.

==== Late Bronze II ====
In Late Bronze II, there are little remains excempt tombs.

=== Iron Age II ===
==== Northern kingdom of Israel (Samaria) ====
Dothan served as an Israelite administrative centre, and archaeologists have discovered a large complex and Hebrew inscriptions at the site. During Iron Age II, it was a city in the Kingdom of Israel. Archaeologist William G. Dever estimates the city's population to have been around 1,200 people during the 9th and 8th centuries BCE.

A bronze bull was found in an Israelite sanctuary east of Tell Dothan, in the mountains of Samaria, dated to around the 11th century, which may be related to the episode of the golden calf.

During excavations carried out at Tel Dothan (between 1953 and 1964) several epigraphic findings were discovered. One of them is the Abisur Bulla, a Hebrew inscribed bulla found in the collapse of a four-room house dating to the late 9th or early 8th century BC. That bulla was once used as a seal for a textile sack. This is evidence by the impressions of cord and fabric on the bulla's reverse. The bulla is considered significant because it bears the first known mention of the Hebrew personal name Abisur. Additionally, its inscription is topped by Phoenician-style hieroglyphs. As one of the earliest datable seals from the Kingdom of Israel, it is an important benchmark for local literacy between the late Iron Age IIA and the early Iron Age IIB.

In excavations carried out in a later phase of the site, a fragmentary inked ostracon was found in Area L, of which only three complete letters survive. It uses the Aramaic script, and the letters are paleographically dated to the 7th century BC. This is important since it adds evidence for the changing of local literacy practices during the post-Israelite period.

In 2013, the top of a four-horned stone altar of Iron Age type was identified among the structural remains of Building/House 14 in Excavation Area L, originally exposed during Free's 1950s–1960s excavations but not previously recognized. Based on its stratigraphic context, the altar has been dated to the early Iron Age IIA, around the 9th century BCE.

=== Byzantine period ===
The Reḥov mosaic inscription from the Byzantine period lists Dothan (דותן) among the Jewish settlements of the Sebaste district whose inhabitants were exempt from agricultural laws governing produce because of the territory's ambiguous status.

=== Crusader period ===
Castellum Beleismum (Latin) or Chastiau St Job (medieval French) was the Frankish name of a tower built by the Crusaders on the ancient tell in 1156 and given to the Hospitallers in 1187.

=== Modern discovery ===
Charles William Meredith van de Velde visited the site in 1851 and was considered the first modern traveller to visit it. He described the discovery in his 1854 book:

...I saw a huge tell at the distance of only a few hundred yards from our way, covered over with ruins, and the fragment of an ancient aqueduct, that had been supported on arches. I asked Abu Monsur the name of the tell, and the answer was, "Haida Dothan" (that is, Dothan). "Dothan," I asked, "Dothan?" "Nahm; Dothan, Dothan, Dothan!" exclaimed the testy old shech, as if hurt at my not believing him at the instant. My object in reiterating the question was to get him to repeat the name; for the discovery of Dothan was a very special circumstance, with respect to which I was anxious to assure myself, by having the name properly pronounced.

Van de Velde's visit had taken place a few days before Edward Robinson's; Robinson credited van ve Velde with the discovery.

== Modern use of the name ==
The Israeli settlement of Mevo Dotan (lit. Approach to Dothan) is named for the city, as is Dothan, Alabama in the US.

== See also ==
- Archaeology of Israel
- List of biblical places
- Jubb Yussef (Joseph's Well) in the Galilee, believed by Muslims to be the site of Joseph's pit or well

== Bibliography ==
- Conder, C.R. (1878). Tent work in Palestine. A record of discovery and adventure. Vol. 1. Internet.archive (from Harvard collection). (pp. 116 -117)
- Conder, C.R.; Kitchener, H.H. (1882). The Survey of Western Palestine: Memoirs of the Topography, Orography, Hydrography, and Archaeology. Vol. 2. London: Committee of the Palestine Exploration Fund. (p. 215)
- Guérin, V. (1875). Description Géographique Historique et Archéologique de la Palestine (in French). Vol. 2: Samarie, pt. 2. Paris: L'Imprimerie Nationale. (pp. 219-222)
- Maundrell, H. (1703). A Journey from Aleppo to Jerusalem: At Easter, A. D. 1697. Oxford: Printed at the Theatre. (p. 57)
- Palmer, E.H. (1881). The Survey of Western Palestine: Arabic and English Name Lists Collected During the Survey by Lieutenants Conder and Kitchener, R. E. Transliterated and Explained by E.H. Palmer. Committee of the Palestine Exploration Fund. (p. 194)
- Robinson, E.; Smith, E. (1841). Biblical Researches in Palestine, Mount Sinai and Arabia Petraea: A Journal of Travels in the year 1838. Vol. 3. Boston: Crocker & Brewster. (pp. 316 - 317)
- Zertal, A. (2004). The Manasseh Hill Country Survey. Vol. 1. Boston: BRILL. ISBN 90-04-13756-4. (pp. 149-150)
