= Umm al-Amad, Al-Mukharram =

Umm al-Amad أم العمد
- Village
- Umm al-Amed
- Location in Syria
- Coordinates: 34°48′50″N 37°0′26″E
- Country: Syria
- Governorate: Homs
- District: Al-Mukharram
- Subdistrict: Al-Mukharram

Population (2004)
  - Total: 2,851
- Time zone: UTC+2 (EET)
  - Summer (DST): +3

Umm al-Amad (Arabic: أم العمد, also spelled Umm al-Amed or Um Elamad) is a village in central Syria, administratively part of the Homs Governorate. Nearby towns include al-Mukharram to the east, al-Mukharram al-Tahtani to the northeast, Danibah to the north, and al-Mishirfeh to the east. According to the Central Bureau of Statistics, Umm al-Amad had a population of 2,851. Its inhabitants are predominantly Shia Muslims.
