= Fatim al-Arnouk =

Fatim al-Amuq فطيم عرنوق Futtaim al-Arnouk
- Location in Syria
- Coordinates: 34°38′25″N 37°1′45″E
- Country: Syria
- Governorate: Homs Governorate
- District: Homs District
- Nahiya: Furqlus

Population (2004)
  - Total: 462
- Time zone: UTC+3 (AST)

Fatim al-Amuq (Arabic: فطيم عرنوق, also spelled Futtaim al-Arnouk) is a village in central Syria, administratively part of the Homs Governorate, east of Homs. It is adjacent to the village of al-Sayyid, west of Furqlus and south of Tell Shinan. According to the Central Bureau of Statistics, it had a population of 462 in the 2004 census.
