= Jubb al-Uthman =

Jubb al-Uthman جب العثمان
- Village
- Location in Syria
- Coordinates: 35°30′29″N 37°14′0″E
- Country: Syria
- Governorate: Hama
- District: Hama
- Subdistrict: Hamraa

Population (2004)
  - Total: 2,033
- Time zone: UTC+3 (AST)
- City Qrya Pcode: C3074

Jubb al-Uthman (Arabic: جب العثمان) is a Syrian village located in Al-Hamraa Nahiyah in Hama District, Hama. According to the Syria Central Bureau of Statistics (CBS), Jeb Elothman had a population of 2033 in the 2004 census. During the Syrian civil war, Jubb al-Uthman was captured by ISIS, then captured by SAA on 6 February 2018.
