= Alrayyan TV =

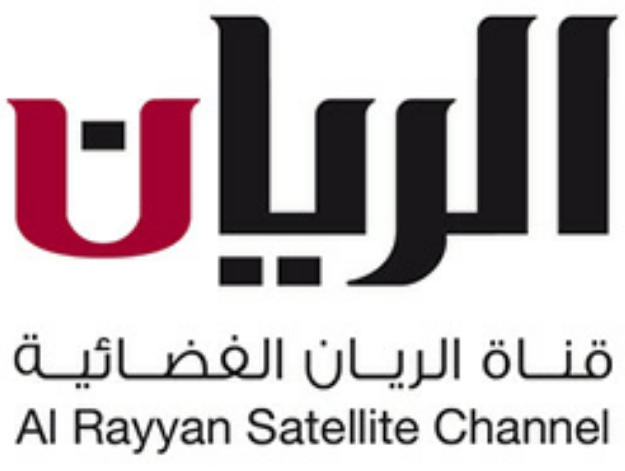
- Country: Qatar
- Broadcast area: Worldwide, via Satellite and Internet

Programming
- Languages: English, Arabic

Ownership
- Owner: Al Rayyan Media

History
- Launched: 2011

Links
- Website: alrayyan.tv

Availability

Streaming media
- Live stream: [www.alrayyan.tv/البث-المباشر/] (AlRyyan TV English)

Alrayyan TV (Arabic; قناة الريان الفضائية) is one of the arms of Al Rayyan Media and Marketing Company of the Special Engineering Office, the manufacturing company, and through "Al Rayyan" Productions a series of films and programs for the organizing committee of the national day celebrations.

Al Rayyan TV's stated programming objectives are aligned with the Qatar National Vision 2030 with three functions: development, awareness, and entertainment. The channel targets audiences in Qatar and focuses on topics related to Qatari national identity, culture and heritage, as well as social and educational issues.
