= Buwaydah, Suran =

Buwaydah بويضة Bweideh
- Village
- Location in Syria
- Coordinates: 35°18′59″N 36°41′43″E
- Country: Syria
- Governorate: Hama
- District: Hama
- Subdistrict: Suran

Population (2004)
  - Total: 486
- Time zone: UTC+3 (AST)
- City Qrya Pcode: C3020

Buwaydah (Arabic: بويضة) is a Syrian village located in the Suran Subdistrict in Hama District. According to the Syria Central Bureau of Statistics (CBS), Buwaydah had a population of 486 in the 2004 census.
