= Ami'ad =

Ami'ad: עַמִּיעַד (Hebrew)
- Kibbutz

Hebrew transcription(s)
  - Official: Ammi'ad
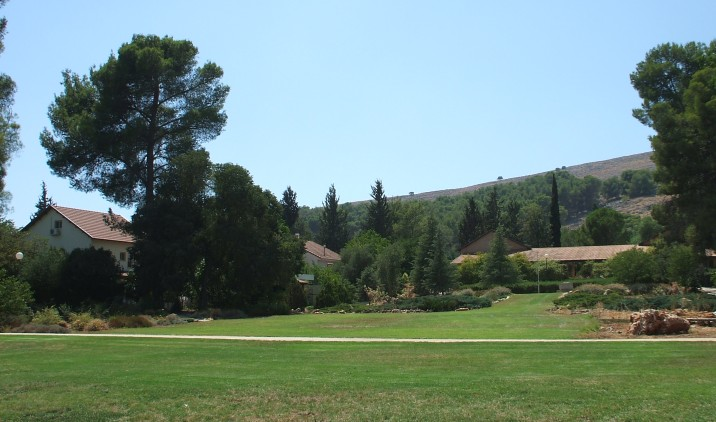

- Location within Northeast Israel
- Coordinates: 32°55′42″N 35°32′27″E
- Country: Israel
- District: Northern
- Subdistrict: Safed
- Council: Upper Galilee
- Region: Galilee
- Affiliation: Kibbutz Movement
- Founded: 1946
- Founder: Palmach
- Population (2024): 618

Ami'ad (Hebrew: עַמִּיעַד) is a kibbutz in northern Israel. Located on the Korazim Plateau, it falls under the jurisdiction of Upper Galilee Regional Council. In 2024 it had a population of 618.

== History ==
The founders were a gar'in of 28 young people who were originally from the Youth Aliyah village of Ben Shemen (rescued from Europe before the borders were closed) and a group of youngsters from Kibbutz Hulda. The original plan was to prepare the outpost as a future settlement for demobilized soldiers from the Jewish Brigade of the British Army but instead they decided to settle the outpost themselves.

The group were graduates of the Hanoar Haoved Movement and the first to form a unit in the Palmach.

They initially settled on a hill around two kilometres south of modern Ami'ad, naming their settlement Jubb Yosef after the nearby ruins. They later moved to the current site, renaming the kibbutz HaHoshlim, before adopting the current name.

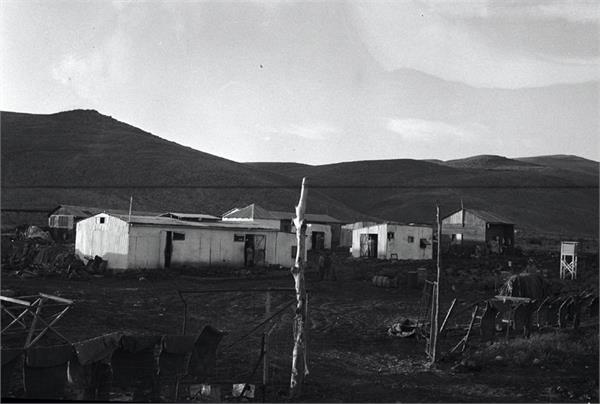
Ami’ad 1947

== Economy ==
In addition to agriculture (avocado, banana and olive plantations; poultry and cattle), kibbutz Ami'ad has a successful factory that manufactures water filtration solutions. The company, Amiad Water Systems Ltd. (previously Amiad Filtration Systems Ltd.) is listed on the London Stock Exchange and has operations in Europe, the United States, Brazil, India, China and Australia.
