= YAB =

YAB or yab may refer to:

- Arctic Bay Airport (IATA code), Nunavut, Canada
- Yab (programming language), a version of Yabasic
- Yamaguchi Asahi Broadcasting, a television station in Yamaguchi Prefecture, Japan
