= Ar Rayyan, Saudi Arabia =

Ar Rayyan
- Village
- Location in Saudi Arabia
- Coordinates: 21°40′42″N 39°53′52″E
- Country: Saudi Arabia
- Province: Makkah Province
- Time zone: UTC+3 (EAT)
  - Summer (DST): UTC+3 (EAT)

Ar Rayyan is a village in Makkah Province, in western Saudi Arabia.

== See also ==
- List of cities and towns in Saudi Arabia
- Regions of Saudi Arabia
