= Jub Jub =

Jub Jub may refer to:

- Jub-Jub a fictional iguana from The Simpsons
- Jubjub bird, a creature mentioned in Lewis Carroll's poems
- Jub Jub (musician), South African hip hop artist
