= Jubb al-Ghar =

Jubb al-Ghar جب الغار
- Village
- Location in Syria
- Coordinates: 35°38′N 36°13′E
- Country: Syria
- Governorate: Hama
- District: Al-Suqaylabiyah District
- Subdistrict: Shathah Subdistrict

Population (2004)
  - Total: 821
- Time zone: UTC+3 (AST)
- City Qrya Pcode: C3176

Jubb al-Ghar (Arabic: جب الغار jubb al-ghār) is a Syrian village located in Shathah Subdistrict in Al-Suqaylabiyah District, Hama. According to the Syria Central Bureau of Statistics (CBS), the village had a population of 821 in the 2004 census. As of 21 February 2025, the village was uninhabited.
