= Furqlus =

al-Furqlus ٱلْفَرْقَلُس Fırıklus
- Town
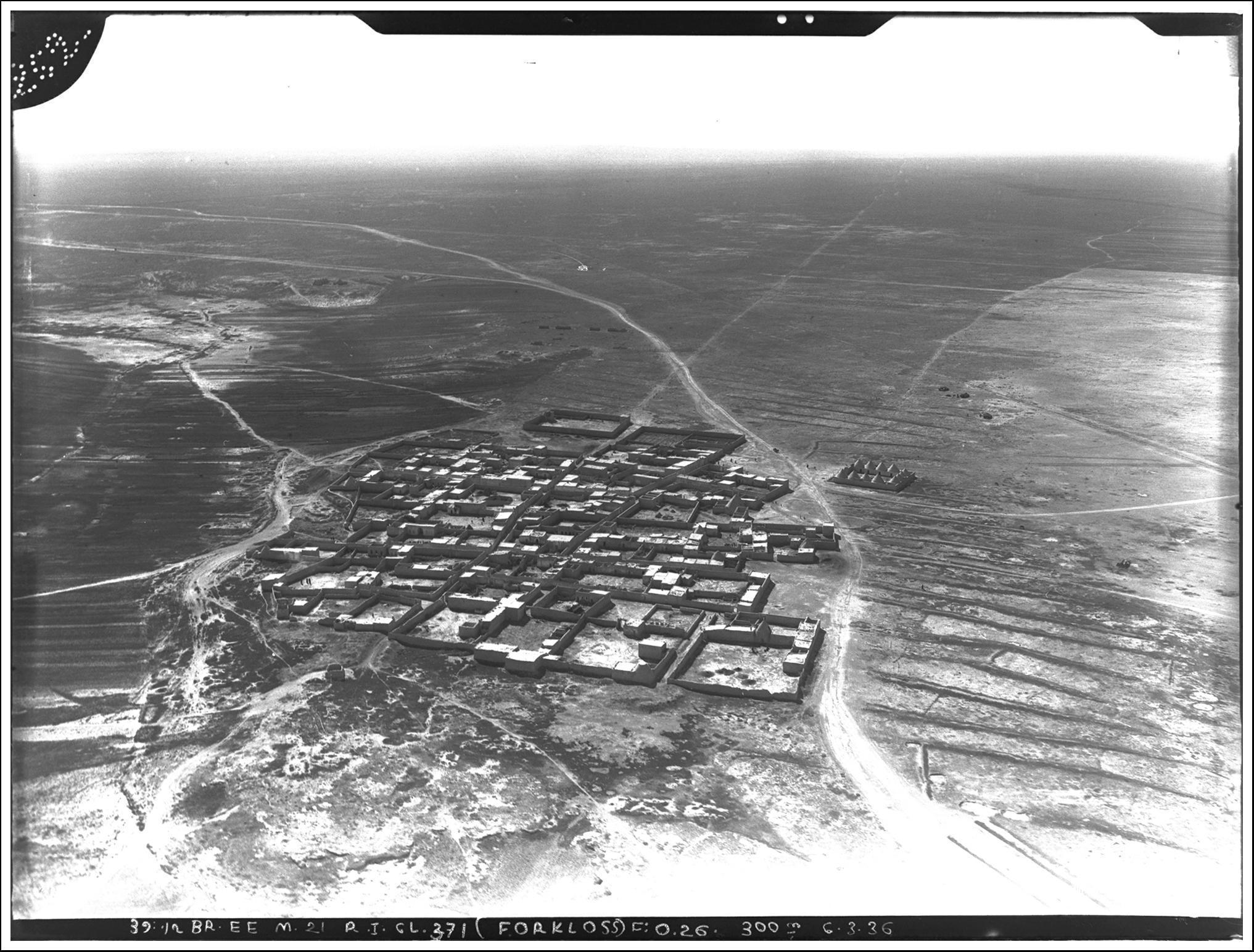
- 1936 aerial view of Furqlus

- Location in Syria
- Coordinates: 34°36′0″N 37°5′0″E
- Country: Syria
- Governorate: Homs
- District: Homs
- Subdistrict: Furqlus

Population (2004)
  - Total: 5,096
- Time zone: UTC+3 (AST)

Furqlus (Turkish: Fırıklus, Arabic: ٱلْفَرْقَلُس, romanized: al-Farqalus, Furglus or Furklus) is a town in central Syria, administratively part of the Homs Governorate, east of the city of Homs. Situated at the eastern approaches of the Syrian Desert, the town is located between al-Qaryatayn to the south, Sadad to the southwest, Shinshar to the west, Fatim al-Amuq and al-Sayyid to the northwest, al-Mukharram to the north and Palmyra to the east. According to the Central Bureau of Statistics (CBS), Furqlus had a population of 5,096 in the 2004 census.

== History ==
=== Antiquity and etymology ===
During the Byzantine Empire era in Syria, Furqlus was known as "Betproclis" or "Betroclus," which were Greek transliterations of its original Semitic name "Beth Forklos." Its Latin name was "Proclus." The Arabicization of the latter part of the town's Greek name "proclis" was "Furqlus."

The late 5th-century Byzantine document Notitia Dignitatum listed Betroclus as one of the two sites in Syria where regular Arab army units were stationed as part of the defense of the Phoenicia province. Although they were not listed as foederati, their inclusion in the Notitia Dignitatum suggested that these units possessed distinguished merit. Mentioned as indigenae, Betroclus was the only one of the two where the unit's make-up was entirely indigenous.

During the 5th century CE, the town was controlled either by the Salihids or the Tanukhids. By the 6th century, the Ghassanids gained power in the region as vassals of the Byzantine Empire.

=== Middle Ages ===
The 13th-century Syrian geographer Yaqut al-Hamawi visited Furqlus in 1226, during Ayyubid rule. He wrote that it was "a spring near Salamiyah in Syria. The name is foreign, not Arabic." In 1293, the commander of the Bedouin tribes in Syria, Muhanna ibn Isa, his son Musa ibn Muhanna and his brother Fadl ibn Isa, were arrested at Furqlus during a meeting with the Mamluk sultan, al-Ashraf Khalil, who was there on a hunting expedition.

=== Ottoman era ===
In 1838 Furqlus was described as an abandoned village by English scholar Eli Smith. In the late 19th century, Furqlus, which by then had been re-inhabited, suffered a major Bedouin raid, a common occurrence in the town which was surrounded by Bedouin encampments. According to Western traveler John Kelman, the Bedouin seized harvested crops and "emptied the houses ... of every piece of brass that they contained." Furqlus was abandoned until the Ottoman government in Istanbul established a sizable cavalry garrison there for the Ottoman army. Returning residents had to pay extra sums for the state protection which markedly reduced the rate of Bedouin incursions, although they continued steadily nonetheless.

The houses in Furqlus during that period were known as "beehives." Instead of the common flat roof homes present in most of Ottoman Syria, the houses were topped by tall white domes that rose to sharp angles at their pinnacles and were intended to protect the residences from rain damage. Furqlus was administered by Arab sheikhs who each headed their own clan or tribe.

=== Modern era ===
In the 1960s, Furqlus was a large village with houses built on terraced land. In the eastern part of the village, a few houses were built from mud brick with cone-shaped dome roofs.

In 2009, the Syrian government, in a joint venture with the governments of Iran, Venezuela and the al-Bukhari Group of Malaysia, began construction of an oil refinery in al-Furqlus. The estimated cost of the project was $3 billion and the plant would have the capacity to refine 140,000 barrels per day.

The gas plant was destroyed by ISIS in March 2016.

== Bibliography ==
- Boulanger, Robert (1966). The Middle East, Lebanon, Syria, Jordan, Iraq, Iran. Hachette.
- Geological Survey (2011). Minerals Yearbook Area Reports: International Review, 2009, Africa and the Middle East. Government Printing Office. ISBN 978-1411329751.
- Kelman, John (1908). From Damascus to Palmyra. A. and C. Black. "Furklus."
- Shahid, Irfan (1984). Byzantium and the Arabs in the Fourth Century. Dumbarton Oaks. ISBN 0884021165.
- Shahid, Irfan (1989). Byzantium and the Arabs in the Fifth Century. Dumbarton Oaks. ISBN 0884021521.
- Shahid, Irfan (1995). Byzantium and the Arabs in the Sixth Century. Dumbarton Oaks. ISBN 0884022145.
- le Strange, Guy (1890). Palestine Under the Moslems: A Description of Syria and the Holy Land from A.D. 650 to 1500. Committee of the Palestine Exploration Fund. p. 493. "Lajjun Guy le Strange."
- Versteegh, Kees (2008). Encyclopedia of Arabic Language and Linguistics. BRILL. ISBN 978-9004144767.
- Smith, Eli; Robinson, Edward (1841). Biblical Researches in Palestine, Mount Sinai and Arabia Petraea: A Journal of Travels in the Year 1838. Vol. 3. Crocker and Brewster.
