= Al-Sayyid, Syria =

al-Sayyid الصايد al-Sayed
- Location in Syria
- Coordinates: 34°38′18″N 37°1′34″E
- Country: Syria
- Governorate: Homs Governorate
- District: Homs District
- Nahiyah: Furqlus

Population (2004)
  - Total: 1,309
- Time zone: UTC+3 (EET)
  - Summer (DST): UTC+2 (EEST)

Al-Sayyid (Arabic: الصايد, romanized: aṣ-Ṣāyid, also spelled al-Sayed) is a village in central Syria, administratively part of the Homs Governorate, located east of Homs in the Syrian Desert. Nearby localities include Fatim al-Arnouk to the immediate northeast, Tell Shinan to the northwest and Furqlus to the southeast. According to the Central Bureau of Statistics (CBS), al-Sayyid had a population of 1,309 in the 2004 census. By 2019, its population was 4,357. It is a mixed village of Alawites and Sunnis.
