= Jubb al-Jarrah =

Jubb al-Jarrah جب الجراح
- Town
- Jeb al-Jarah
- Location in Syria
- Coordinates: 34°49′0″N 37°19′0″E
- Country: Syria
- Governorate: Homs
- District: Al-Mukharram
- Subdistrict: Jubb al-Jarrah

Population (2004)
  - Total: 2,255
- Time zone: UTC+2 (EET)
  - Summer (DST): +3

Jubb al-Jarrah (Arabic: جب الجراح, also spelled Jeb al-Jarah) is a village in central Syria, administratively part of the Homs Governorate. Nearby towns include al-Mukharram to the west, Salamiyah to the northwest and al-Qaryatayn further to the south. According to the Central Bureau of Statistics, Jubb al-Jarrah had a population of 2,255. Like other villages in the al-Mukharram District, Jubb al-Jarrah's inhabitants are predominantly Alawites. Historian Matti Moosa claims that prominent Alawite figures from the Ba'ath Party convened secretly at Jubb al-Jarrah on 30 January 1968 and made a decision there to abolish Muslim and Christian religious teaching in Syrian schools.

== Syrian Civil War ==
On 22 November 2016, the Syrian Army repelled an ISIS attack on the settlement. On 9 April 2023, four soldiers were killed when their outpost on the outskirts of the village was attacked by ISIS.
