= Al-Mukharram =

City in Syria

Al-Mukharram المخرم
- City
- Al-Mukharram al-Fawqani
- Location in Syria
- Coordinates: 34°49′N 37°5′E
- Country: Syria
- Governorate: Homs
- District: Al-Mukharram
- Subdistrict: Al-Mukharram
- Elevation: 600 m (2,000 ft)

Population (2004)
  - Total: 6,202
- Time zone: UTC+2 (EET)
  - Summer (DST): +3

Al-Mukharram (Arabic: المخرم), also known as Mukharram al-Fawqani (Arabic: المخرم الفوقاني; also spelled Makhem Fuqani or Mkhurem Fouqani) is a small city in central Syria, capital of the al-Mukharram District, administratively part of the Homs Governorate, located 42 kilometres (26 miles) northeast of Homs.

== History ==
In 1838 al-Mukharram was classified as a khirba ("ruined" or "abandoned" village") in the District of Salamiyah. The general region of the desert plains east of Homs and Hama was repopulated during the late 19th century by local Bedouins and by Ismaili and Alawite peasants from the areas west of Homs and Hama, as well as Circassians. The modern town was of al-Mukharram was founded in 1882, although its inhabitants struggled to make a living off the semi-arid region.

In 1960, al-Mukharram was still an impoverished village populated by Alawite sharecropper families employed by landlords based in Homs. Under these circumstances, the Syrian Army provided an attractive alternative for the men of the village to advance socially and economically. Various figures from the town have served in high-ranking positions in the Syrian military and security apparatus, including Muhammad Umran, former Defense Minister (early 1966), whose father had been a religious Alawite shaykh and a local leader of the town. Other notable Syrian military figures from al-Mukharram include Ahmed Sa'id Salih, the former Chief of Political Security (1970-1987) and deputy Interior Minister, Adnan Badr Hassan, another former Chief of Political Security (1987-2002), and Abd al-Karim al-Razzuq the late 1970s commander of the missile corps and the air defense forces.

In 1968, al-Mukharram became the capital of the district that has since shared its name, taking the place of Jubb al-Jarrah, the former district center. Although the village's population was only 2,170 in 1970, well below the government-designated threshold required to become a district seat, the close relationship between the residents and the security establishment allowed for al-Mukharram to be promoted to is current role, according to anthropologist Fabrice Balanche.

The old city of al-Mukharram remains a commercial and residential area. The modern city contains a number of schools and community colleges, a weather station, a large carpet-production factory and a large warehouse for storing animal seeds. Agriculture and raising livestock, namely cattle and sheep, constitutes a major sector of al-Mukharram's economy. Grains are cultivated in the dry lands, vegetables in the plains, and olives, grapes, pistachios and almonds in irrigated lands in the hilly parts of the city. The chief agricultural products are olives and almonds. The latter crop has become the object of celebration, with residents holding an annual "Almond Festival" since 2010.

== Geography ==
Al-Mukharram is situated on a plain along the western fringes of the Syrian Desert, east of the central Orontes River valley. It is located 42 kilometres (26 miles) northeast of Homs, the governorate capital, and south of Salamiyah. Al-Mukharram's old city sits on the Tell al-Shayb hill, while the modern town has expanded up to 1.2 kilometres (0.7 miles) from and around the hill. The city's area consists of some 600 hectares. Nearby localities include al-Mukharram al-Tahtani to the northwest, Uthmaniyah to the north, Abu Hakfah al-Janubi to the northeast, Sankari and Jubb al-Jarrah to the east, Umm Jabab and Umm Tuwaynah to the south and Umm al-Amad and Buwaydat Salamiyah to the west.

=== Archaeology ===
In a residential area of the city exists a cone-shaped domed structure built from mud brick and stone. It has a height of 3.4 metres (11.2 feet) and a diameter of 2.45 metres (8.04 feet). The structure has a wooden door and 13 square or triangle-shaped openings in the upper portion of the dome. It is currently used as a stable or barn and a home has been built adjacent to it. The oldest part of al-Mukharram is built on a tell (archaeological mound), and there are several other tells to the northeast.

== Demographics ==
According to the Syria Central Bureau of Statistics (CBS), al-Mukharram had a population of 6,202 in the 2004 census. It is the administrative center and largest locality in the al-Mukharram nahiyah ("subdistrict") which consisted of 30 localities with a collective population of 32,447 in 2004. The inhabitants of al-Mukharram and the localities of its district are predominantly members of the Alawite community, particularly from the Khayyatin tribal confederation.

== Bibliography ==
- Batatu, Hanna (1999). Syria's Peasantry, the Descendants of Its Lesser Rural Notables, and Their Politics. Princeton University Press. ISBN 0691002541.
- Smith, Eli; Robinson, Edward (1841). Biblical Researches in Palestine, Mount Sinai and Arabia Petraea: A Journal of Travels in the Year 1838. Vol. 3. Crocker and Brewster.
