= Al-Mukharram District =

Al-Mukharram District منطقة المخرم Al-Makhrim District
- District
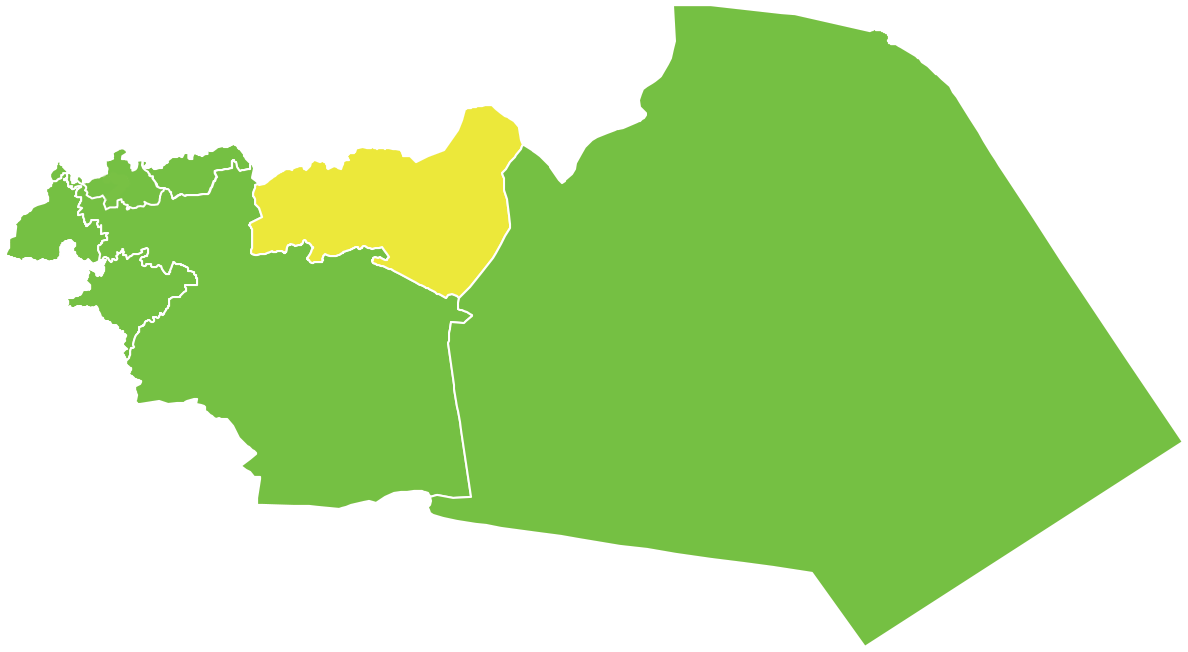
- Map of Al-Mukharram District within Homs Governorate
- Coordinates (Al-Mukharram): 34.82°N 37.08°E
- Country: Syria
- Governorate: Homs
- Seat: Al-Mukharram
- Subdistricts: 2 nawāḥī

Area
  - Total: 3,014.82 km^{2} (1,164.03 sq mi)

Population (2004)
  - Total: 52,068
  - Density: 17.271/km^{2} (44.731/sq mi)
- Geocode: SY0406

Al-Mukharram District (Arabic: منطقة المخرم, romanized: manṭiqat al-Mukharram), also known as Al-Makhrim District, is a district (manṭiqat) of the Homs Governorate, Syria. According to the 2004 census, the district had a population of 52,068. It comprises two subdistricts (nawāḥī), al-Mukharram and Jubb al-Jarrah.

== Geography ==
Al-Mukharram District is one of the six administrative districts (manṭiqat) of Homs Governorate, Syria. Al-Mukharram District is divided into two sub-districts (nawāḥī)–Al-Mukharram and Jubb al-Jarrah. Caper (Capparis spinosa) plants are widely found in the district, which are tapped for its flower buds.

== Demographics ==
According to the 2004 census, Al-Mukharram District had a population of 52,068, comprising 26,380 males and 25,688 females. The census recorded 9,087 households, with an average household size of 5.73 people. The illiteracy rate was 10.6% among males and 28% among females. About 65.6% of the population were recorded as engaged in paid work, 12.8% were self-employed and 16.1% worked without pay. Approximately 91.1% of the households were recorded as own houses.

In 2004, Al-Mukharram sub-district had 32,447 inhabitants and Jubb al-Jarrah had 19,621 inhabitants. According to the United Nations Office for the Coordination of Humanitarian Affairs (OCHA), the population was estimated in 2021 as 45,155 in Al-Makhrim sub-district and 21,801 in Jubb al-Jarrah. The OCHA estimated the population to be 46,655 including 1,256 internally displaced persons in Al-Makhrim sub-district and a population of 22,685 in Jubb al-Jarrah in 2024.

== Syrian civil war ==
During the Syrian Civil War, the district has seen several incidents of violence which has resulted in deaths of civilians. A January 2026 report by the Ministry of Foreign Affairs of Netherlands reported five violent incidents in the district between 1 May and 31 December 2025.
