= Laodikeia Campaign =

Laodikeia Campaign (1057 - 1058)
- Part of the Arab–Byzantine wars
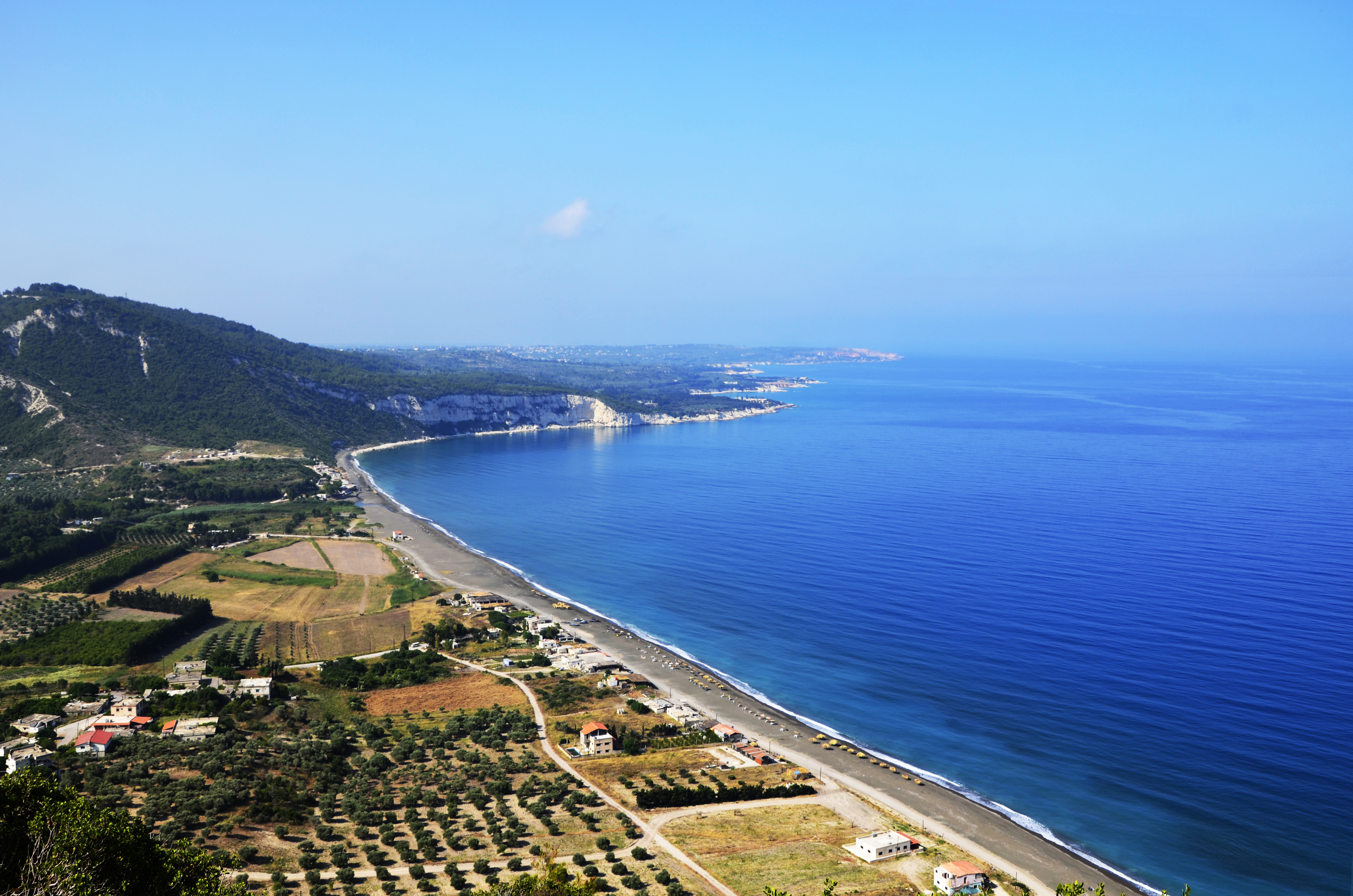
- Modern view of the coastlines of Latakia
Date	1055 – 1056 or 1057 - 1058 (Note: The historians Anthony Kaldellis and Michael Brett date the campaign to the reign of Theodora, while Thierry Bianquis and Mathew Andrew Barber date it to have taken place from the end of Michael VI's reign to the beginning of Isaac Komnenos' reign.)
Location	Laodikeia (modern Latakia, Syria), Antioch (modern Antakya, Turkey)
Result	Byzantine victory
Territorial changes	Laodikeia restored to Byzantium

Belligerents
Byzantine Empire	Fatimid Caliphate

Commanders and leaders
Isaac I Komnenos Romanos Skleros	al-Mustansir Billah Ibn Mulhim (POW) al-Sa'id Layth al-Dawla (POW); Muwaffaq al-Dawla Hifah bin Fatik (POW); Abu'l-Jaysh Askar (POW)

Strength
80 ships Land forces from Antioch	Unknown total; 3,000 reinforcements under Muwaffaq al-Dawla and Abu'l-Jaysh

Casualties and losses
Moderate - Heavy	Heavy; At least two shīnī warships captured

The Laodikeia Campaign was a Byzantine offensive launched in 1055–1056 or in 1057–1058, with the aim of recapturing territory along coastal Syria that had been lost during a Fatimid invasion. The Byzantine forces, consisting mainly of troops drawn from Antioch and an expeditionary fleet, conducted a combined land and maritime operation with the objective to recapture Laodikeia and other Fatimid-held settlements. After a series of engagements, the Byzantines defeated and captured the Fatimid general Ibn Mulhim and retook the lost territories, after which the two powers negotiated an end to hostilities.

== Background ==
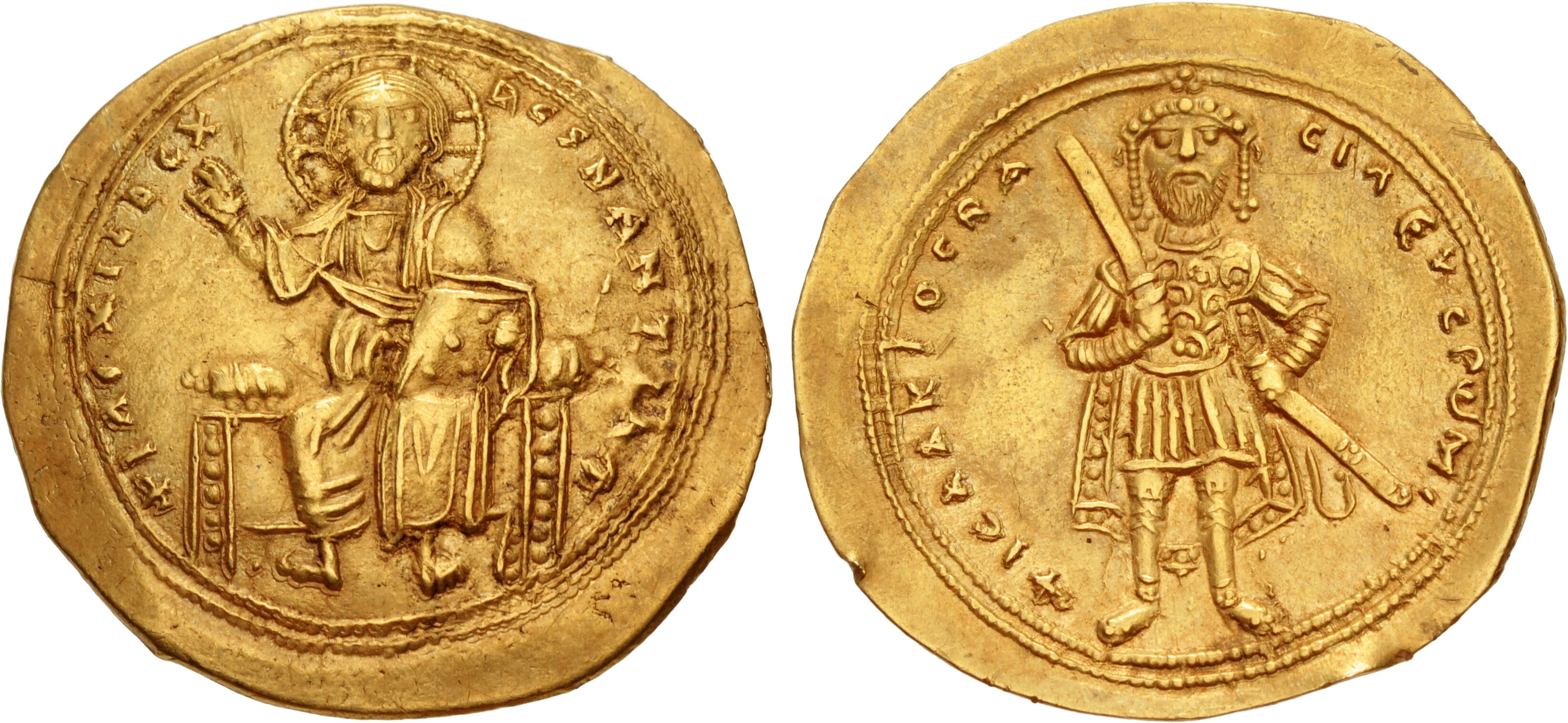
Golden histamenon of Emperor Isaac I Komnenos

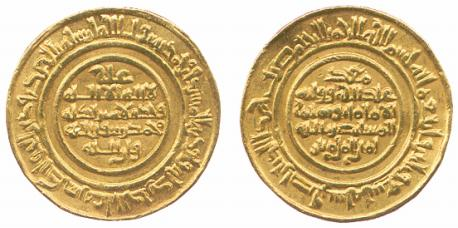
Golden dinar of Caliph Al-Mustansir Billah

In 1035, a truce was signed between the Byzantine Empire under Emperor Michael IV and the Fatimid Caliphate under Caliph al-Zahir li-I'zaz Din Allah, affirming an equilibrium between the two powers' spheres of influence in Syria, which for a period also saw improving of relations. When in 1055 or 1056, Fatimid Egypt entered a period of famine, the Byzantines under Michael VI Bringas began assembling a shipment of 100,000 qafiz of wheat from Constantinople at Antioch for the relief of Egypt, while also sending gifts to the Fatimids as a gesture of peace. However, in September 1057, Michael VI was deposed by Isaac I Komnenos. According to al-Maqrizi, Isaac halted the shipment of grain under the pretext that these supplies could be redirected to support military campaigns of the Byzantines against their other enemies. The relations between the Fatimids and Byzantium had already been strained during the reign of Empress Theodora, when in 1055 the Byzantines decreed that the prayer in the mosque at Constantinople be said on behalf of the Abbasids of Baghdad, at this time subject to the Fatimids' emerging rivals in the Islamic Word, the Seljuk Empire. This signified a symbolic loss of prestige for the Fatimids, which in turn bred diplomatic hostility with the Byzantines, while also causing fears in Cairo of a possible Byzantine-Seljuk alliance against the Fatimids.

In retaliation to this affront, the Fatimid Vizier Abu Muhammad al-Yazuri ordered Ibn Mulhim, a veteran of wars in Ifriqiya against the Zirids, to organise an invasion into Byzantine territory and besiege Laodikeia. This incursion prompted a period of diplomatic negotiation between al-Yazuri and the Byzantine emperor, which was unsuccessful. Then, a second Fatimid force under Emir al-Sa'id Layth al-Dawla entered Byzantine territory and reinforced ibn Mulhim, facilitating the successful capture and sack of Laodikeia, after which the ibn Mulhim and al-Dawla extended their raids into the surrounding Byzantine territory. At this juncture, a third Fatimid force of 3,000 men under the Emir Muwaffaq al-Dawla Hifah b. Fatik and the Emir Abu'l-Jaysh c Askar joined the two armies already in Laodikeia, and raided the region as far as the outskirts of Antioch, while taking numerous captives. Elements of the Fatimid navy also supported Mulhim's campaign along the Syrian coast. According to the Ittiʿāẓ of Mazriqi, Ibn Mulhim also invested the fortress of Qusṭūl for twenty days until the inhabitants surrenderd, before returning to Apamea, in order to lay siege to that settlement, using mangonels against its fortification. The inhabitants negotiated a treaty for ibn Mulhim's withdrawal, but when the Fatimid forces departed, they set fire to the fortress and attempted to flee. However, ibn Mulhim returned, massacred the retreating Apameans, and managed to extinguish the fire and occupy the city.

== Byzantine counteroffensive ==
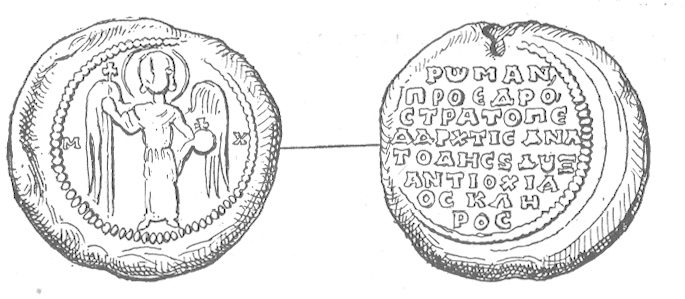
Seal of Proedros, Stratopedarches of the East and Doux of Antioch Romanos Skleros

In 1058, as a response to the Fatimid incursions, Isaac Komnenos organised a force of eighty warships, which were dispatched towards the Syrian coast, where they joined forces with the men serving under Romanos Skleros (referred to as ibn Skleros by Maqrizi). Although the Egyptian court at this time had grown more concerned with the growing threat of the Seljuks, resulting in the execution of Vizier Abu Muhammad al-Yazuri, after he had been accused of colluding with the Turkomans, a negotiated settlement with the Byzantines eluded the Fatimids, when an attempt by the Mirdasid Emir of Aleppo, Thimal ibn Salih (who enjoyed good relations with both the Fatimids and Byzantines) to mediate peace between the two sides failed. Consequently, the Byzantine navy initiated its counteroperations against the Fatimids, shortly after the date of al-Yazuri's execution, in early spring 1058.

The Byzantine counteroffensive engaged in heavy fighting with the Fatimids over a series of engagements. In a naval engagement at an unknown location, a detachment of the Byzantine fleet scored a victory against a Fatimid squadron, which resulted in the capture of two shīnī warships, onboard of which the Byzantines found great quantities of loot. In another recorded operation, the Byzantine fleet is described to have raided Tripoli and fought an engagement with its garrison, in which both sides sustained heavy losses. (Note: The Ittiʿāẓ does not record which side won this engagement.) Al-Mulhim also remained active and launched a counterraid towards Antioch, where he managed to free a number of Fatimid prisoners of war after intercepting a Byzantine caravan attempting to transport them to Anatolia. However, the strategic balance ultimately turned in favour of the Byzantines, and after several battles and skirmishes by land and sea, ibn Mulhim and the Arab tribal leaders who fought alongside him were defeated and captured by Romanos Skleros' forces. The Byzantines also recaptured Apamea and Laodikeia during the fighting.

== Aftermath ==
Shortly after the capture of ibn Mulhim and his lieutenants, the two sides negotiated a peace settlement under which ibn Mulhim was released. The war over Laodikeia was the final major conflict between the Fatimid Caliphate and the Byzantine Empire in the 11th century, as both states soon diverted their military attention towards the growing power of the Seljuk Empire. Byzantium had already faced invasions by the Seljuks before the war with the Fatimids, as in 1055 Theodore Aaronios, governor of Taron, defeated a number of Turkoman raids but was eventually mortally wounded while repulsing these attacks, forcing Empress Theodora to dispatch a governor to replace him. The Fatimids began to engage in warfare against the Seljuks in 1057 when, with most of their field armies engaging the Byzantines near the Syrian coasts or fighting the Zirids in North Africa, they dispatched the Persian scholar Al-Mu'yyad to form an alliance with Iraqi Bedouin tribes for a joint campaign into Lower Mesopotamia. Under the command of al-Basasiri, this Fatimid-Bedouin army defeated a Seljuk force at Sinjar in January 1057, after which they captured Mosul. However, this success would be short-lived, as in 1058 Sultan Tughril I personally led a campaign that forced al-Basasiri and Al-Mu'ayyad to retreat West of the Euphrates.

== Bibliography ==
- Kaldellis, Anthony (2017). Streams of Gold, Rivers of Blood: The Rise and Fall of Byzantium, 955 A.D. to the First Crusade. Oxford University Press. ISBN 978-0190253226.
- Brett, Michael (2017). Fatimid Empire. Edinburgh University Press. ISBN 978-0-7486-4077-5.
- Bianquis, Thierry (1989). Damas et la Syrie sous la domination fatimide (359–468/969–1076): essai d'interprétation de chroniques arabes médiévales. Vol. II. Damascus: Institut Français de Damas. pp. 553–579.
- Barber, Mathew Andrew (2021). Fatimid historiography and its survival: A case study of the vizierate of al-Yāzūrī (r. 442–450/1050–1058) (Thesis).
- Lastiverttsʻi, Aristakēs (1963). Yuzbashyan, Karen (ed.). Patmutʻiwn Aristakisi Lastiverttsʻwoy (in Armenian). Yerevan: Haykakan SSṚ Gitutʻyunneri akademiayi hratarakchʻutʻyun.
  - (English translation: Aristakes Lastivertc'i's History (PDF). Translated by Bedrosian, Robert. New York: Sources of the Armenian Tradition. 1985.
- Yuzbashyan, Karen, ed. (1963). Patmutʻiwn Aristakisi Lastiverttsʻwoy Պատմութիւն Արիստակիսի Լաստիվերտցւոյ (in Armenian). Yerevan: Haykakan SSṚ Gitutʻyunneri Akademiayi hratarakchʻutʻyun. p. 19.
