= Muqallid ibn Kamil =

Member of the Mirdasid dynasty

Muqallid ibn Kamil ibn Mirdas (Arabic: مقلد بن كامل بن مرداس) (fl. 1030–1050) was a member of the Mirdasid dynasty, a commander of the Banu Kilab and at times served as governor of the Aleppo Citadel and the Mirdasids' envoy to the Byzantines and Fatimids.

== Life ==
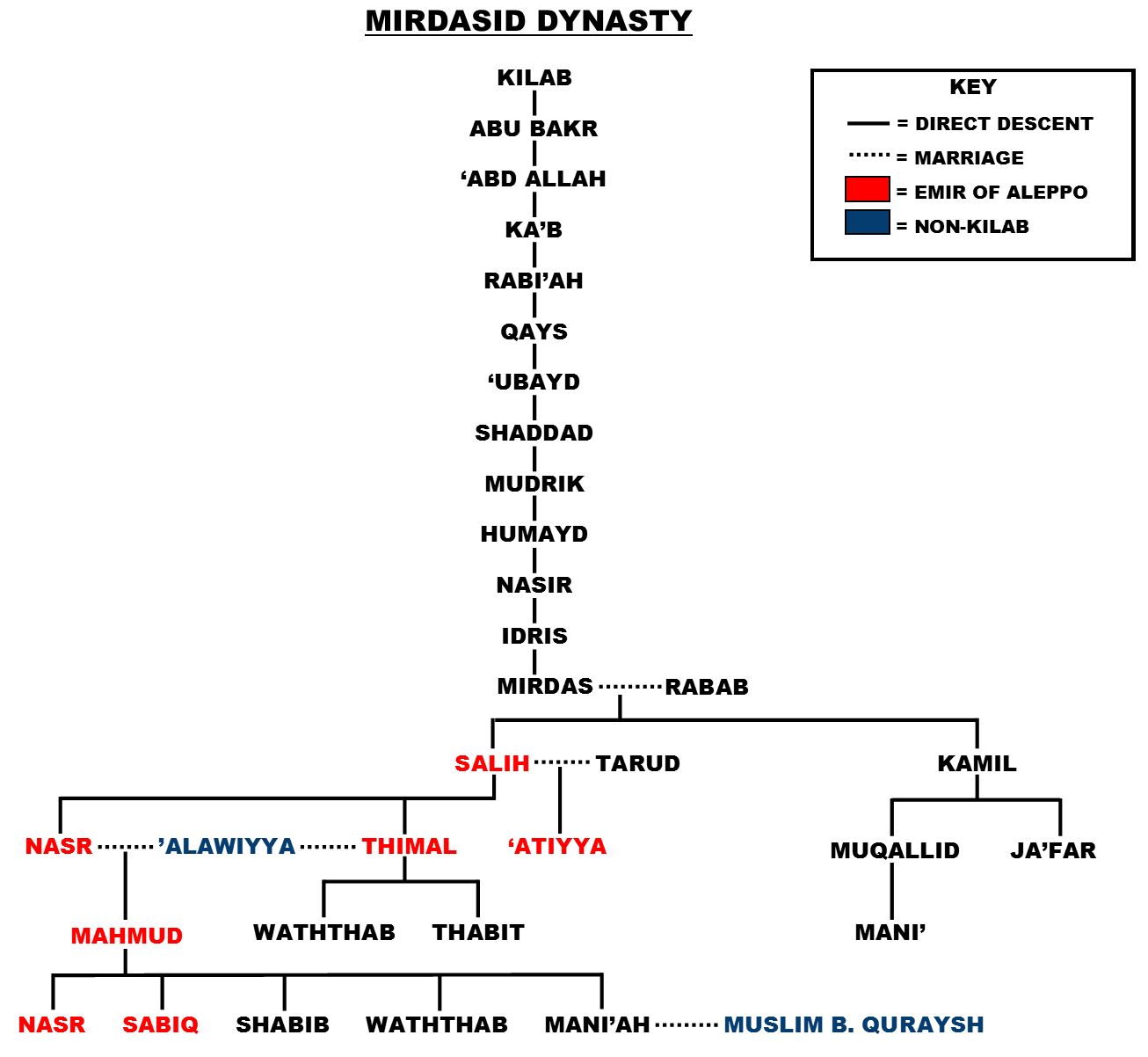
Family tree of the Mirdasid dynasty

Muqallid was the son of Kamil ibn Mirdas, who was a brother of Salih ibn Mirdas, founder of the Mirdasid emirate of Syria and Upper Mesopotamia. In 1030, during the joint reign of Salih's sons and successors, Nasr and Thimal, Muqallid was dispatched as an envoy to Byzantine emperor Romanos III and attempted to persuade him to halt his advance against Aleppo. Romanos rejected the Mirdasids' offer of tribute and detained Muqallid. Romanos continued his advance but was routed by the Mirdasids at the Battle of Azaz.

Muqallid was put in charge of the Aleppo Citadel in June 1038 by Thimal after the latter fled Aleppo in the wake of Nasr's battlefield death at the hands of the Fatimid general Anushtakin al-Dizbari. After Aleppo's deputy governor, Khalifa ibn Jabir al-Kilabi, surrendered the city to al-Dizbari's forces on 19 June, Muqallid continued to hold out. When al-Dizbari himself arrived in Aleppo, Muqallid negotiated his surrender with him and was ultimately allowed to safely depart Aleppo, taking with him numerous treasures from the citadel. After al-Dizbari died in January 1042, Muqallid and Thimal arrived at Aleppo, the latter already having been appointed governor by Fatimid decree, and were allowed in by the city's inhabitants.

The Fatimid governor of Damascus, Nasir al-Dawla ibn Hamdan, launched an offensive against the Mirdasids in 1050 after Muqallid's brother Ja'far killed the Fatimid governor of Hims, Ja'far ibn Kulayd al-Kutami. To prevent the Fatimids from establishing strongholds in the region of Aleppo, Muqallid had the citadels of Hama and Maarrat al-Nu'man dismantled. The Mirdasids' Kilabi forces routed the Fatimids later that year. Muqallid's son Mani' also played a role in Mirdasid politics, in alliance with Mahmud ibn Nasr against his uncle Atiyya ibn Salih.

== Bibliography ==
- Amabe, Fukuzo (2016). Urban Autonomy in Medieval Islam: Damascus, Aleppo, Cordoba, Toledo, Valencia and Tunis. Leiden: Brill. ISBN 978-90-04-31598-3.
- Bianquis, Thierry (1993). "Mirdās". In Bosworth, C. E.; van Donzel, E.; Heinrichs, W. P. & Pellat, Ch. (eds.). The Encyclopaedia of Islam, Second Edition. Volume VII: Mif–Naz. Leiden: E. J. Brill. pp. 115–123. ISBN 978-90-04-09419-2.
- Zakkar, Suhayl (1971). The Emirate of Aleppo: 1004–1094. Aleppo: Dar al-Amanah.
