= Mu'izz al-Dawla Thimal =

Emir of Aleppo from 1048 to 1058

Thimal ibn Salih

Emir of Aleppo
- Reign: February 1048 – August 1058
- Predecessor: Nasr ibn Salih
- Successor: Makin al-Dawla Ibn Mulhim al-Uqayli (Fatimid governor)
- Reign: April 1060 – 1062
- Predecessor: Mahmud ibn Nasr
- Successor: Atiyya ibn Salih
- Born: Unknown
- Died: 1062; Aleppo
- Spouse: Al-Sayyida al-Alawiyya bint Waththab al-Numayri
- Issue: Waththab; Thabit
Names
- Abū ʿUlwān Thimāl ibn Ṣāliẖ ibn Mirdās
Regnal name
- Muʿizz al-Dawla
- Tribe: Banu Kilab
- Dynasty: Mirdasid
- Father: Salih ibn Mirdas
- Religion: Shia Islam

Abu Ulwan Thimal ibn Salih ibn Mirdas (Arabic: أبو علوان ثمال بن صالح بن مرداس, romanized: Abū ʿUlwān Thimāl ibn Ṣāliẖ ibn Mirdās; died 1062), also known by his laqab (honorific epithet) Mu'izz al-Dawla (Arabic: معز الدولة, romanized: Muʿizz al-Dawla), was the Mirdasid emir of Aleppo jointly with his elder brother Shibl al-Dawla Nasr in 1029–1030 and then solely in 1042–1057 and 1061–1062.

The chosen successor of the Mirdasids' founder, his father Salih ibn Mirdas, Thimal was ousted from Aleppo by his brother Nasr in 1030, but retained the Jaziran (Upper Mesopotamian) half of the emirate from his seat in al-Rahba. When Nasr was slain by the Fatimid army of Anushtakin al-Dizbari in 1038, Thimal took control of Aleppo but quickly departed to avoid a Fatimid assault. He once again reverted to his Jaziran domains, which were reduced by Anushtakin's captures of Manbij and Balis. Nevertheless, he gained the Numayrid city of Raqqa after marrying Nasr's widow, the Numayrid princess al-Sayyida al-Alawiyya.

After Anushtakin died in 1042, Thimal assumed control in Aleppo with Fatimid support. Nevertheless, he allied with the Byzantines, becoming a vassal of their empire, to the opposition of the Fatimids. After three abortive Fatimid campaigns against him, Thimal reconciled with the Fatimid caliph al-Mustansir in 1050, while maintaining his tribute to Byzantium. The resulting peace brought stability to the Mirdasid realm for the next seven years, during which Aleppo grew and prospered.

Nevertheless, financial and political conditions and dissent amongst his tribe, the Banu Kilab, the Mirdasids' core troops, compelled Thimal to abdicate in 1057 and retire to Cairo. When the Fatimids' governor of Aleppo was ousted by Thimal's nephew, Mahmud ibn Nasr, in 1060, Thimal reasserted control over the city. He spent much of his short second reign campaigning successfully against the Byzantines.

== Early life and career ==
Thimal was a son of Salih ibn Mirdas, the paramount emir (prince) of the Banu Kilab who founded the Mirdasid dynasty whose territories encompassed the region of Aleppo and the western Jazira. Thimal's birth year is unknown, like that of the other Mirdasids. Like most Muslims of the Aleppo region, the Kilab professed the Twelver Shia doctrine, though to what extent is unclear. One indication of Thimal's subscription to the religion was his kunya (paedonymic), "Abū ʿUlwān", a name associated with Shia Islam. Prior to Salih's capture of Aleppo in 1024, Thimal resided in the fortress of al-Rahba, a fortified town on the middle Euphrates that had been in his father's possession since 1008; Salih lived in a tribal encampment on the outskirts of Aleppo. Until the conquest of Aleppo, the Mirdasid court was in al-Rahba, where it was visited by the poet Ibn Abi Hasina in 1019 and 1022. The poet extolled Thimal in both visits and eulogized him as a malik (king). Ibn Abi Hasina was particularly associated with Thimal and noted nearly every event of his life, though the medieval chroniclers did not record many of these events.

== Struggles for power ==
=== Power-sharing with Nasr ===
Thimal moved to Aleppo following its conquest. He was designated by Salih as his walī al-ʿaḥd (chosen successor) and his name was inscribed accordingly on coinage alongside the names of Salih and the Fatimid caliph, al-Zahir (r. 1021–1036), whose suzerainty the Mirdasids nominally acknowledged. When Salih was slain by the forces of the Fatimid general Anushtakin al-Dizbari, Thimal may have remained in Aleppo, while his elder brother Nasr managed to escape the Mirdasids' rout. Afterward, Nasr and Thimal abandoned the string of central Syrian cities their father had conquered and concentrated their forces in the territories of Jund Qinnasrin and Diyar Mudar, corresponding with northern Syrian and the western Jazira, respectively. They shared power in Aleppo, with Thimal controlling the citadel and Nasr the city. The Byzantine emperor Romanos III (r. 1028–1034) perceived the young Mirdasid emirs as weak rulers whose emirate was susceptible to a Fatimid takeover. Thus, he decided to move against the Mirdasids despite the latter's efforts to negotiate a peaceful arrangement. However, the army Romanos led was routed by a much smaller Mirdasid force led by Nasr at the Battle of Azaz in August 1030.

During the engagement with the Byzantines, Thimal had remained in Aleppo with the bulk of the warriors of Banu Kilab to defend the city and its citadel should Nasr's cavalry be dispersed. The brothers had meanwhile sent away their families to shelter in their tribe's encampments at the outskirts of Aleppo. Subsequent to the Mirdasids' victory, Thimal left Aleppo to bring back his family to the city, but during his absence Nasr seized the citadel and became the sole Mirdasid emir of Aleppo. Thimal sought to regain the city and to that end, gained the support of most of the Banu Kilab. Most likely in response to this threat, Nasr appealed for Byzantine protection and entered Byzantine vassalage in May 1031. The chieftains of the Banu Kilab ultimately mediated a reconciliation between Thimal and Nasr whereby the former would rule the Upper Mesopotamian portion of the Mirdasid emirate from al-Rahba while Nasr would rule the Syrian portion from Aleppo.

=== Conflict with the Fatimid governor of Syria ===
By 1038, Nasr had become embroiled in conflict with al-Dizbari, the powerful Damascus-based governor of Syria. The enmity, dating from al-Dizbari's defeat and killing of Nasr and Thimal's father at al-Uqhuwana, was reignited when the Fatimid vizier al-Jarjara'i engineered the allotment of Homs to Nasr's emirate to al-Dizbari's chagrin. The dismissed Fatimid governor of Homs appealed for al-Dizbari's assistance to oust Nasr, prompting al-Dizbari to launch a campaign against the Mirdasids. Nasr mobilized as many Kilabi warriors as he could and together with Thimal confronted al-Dizbari's troops, whose ranks included numerous Banu Tayy and Banu Kalb tribesmen, near Salamiyah. The Mirdasids were defeated and while they regrouped, al-Dizbari sacked Hama north of Homs. The two sides fought again at Tell Fas, near Latmin. During the battle, Thimal fled with his Kilabi loyalists, leaving Nasr and a small core of supporters to be defeated and slain by al-Dizbari.

According to the historian Suhayl Zakkar, Thimal's intention had been to "restore his own position in Aleppo which Nasr had usurped from him an almost similar way". Nonetheless, he became demoralized at the defeat of his brother and feared he was not in a strong enough position to hold Aleppo. He therefore departed the city for the Jazira with his family, including Nasr's wife, al-Sayyida al-Alawiyya bint Waththab, and the latter and Nasr's son Mahmud ibn Nasr. He left his cousin Muqallid ibn Kamil in charge of the citadel and a Kilabi kinsman, Khalifa ibn Jabir, in charge of the city, while he could gather reinforcements from among the Bedouin tribesmen of the Jazira. Al-Dizbari's army ultimately besieged Aleppo and by June/July 1038, had captured it and expelled Muqallid and Khalifa, along with any Mirdasid loyalists left in the city.

Thimal retained the Mesopotamian portion of Mirdasid emirate, but al-Dizbari later captured Balis and Manbij from him, but was unable to take al-Rahba. Meanwhile, Thimal had married al-Sayyida al-Alawiyya, Nasr's widow and a princess of Thimal's allies, the Banu Numayr. When her brother Shabib ibn Waththab died in 1039/40, she inherited the twin cities of al-Raqqa and al-Rafiqa and subsequently entrusted them with Thimal. The latter made al-Raqqa his capital in order to remain as close as possible to Aleppo.

== Emir of Aleppo ==
=== First reign ===
The Fatimid state, guided by al-Jarjara'i, had grown afoul of al-Dizbari's virtual independence and consolidation of power across Syria. Al-Jarjara'i condemned al-Dizbari as a traitor and much of the Fatimid army in Syria abandoned him. He was ultimately forced to leave Damascus for Aleppo, prompting al-Jarjara'i to request that Thimal neutralize him. Moreover, Thimal was formally granted by the Fatimid caliph al-Mustansir (r. 1036–1094) the governorship of Aleppo. By the time Thimal mobilized his Kilabi and other Bedouin forces from al-Raqqa to seize Aleppo, al-Dizbari died in January 1042. However, Thimal and Muqallid's troops were refused entry into the city by the aḥdāth (urban militia) supported by the Fatimid garrison whose troops defied al-Mustansir's decree. Thimal retreated to the Kilabi tribal encampments at Qinnasrin, but within a few days an opportunity arose to take Aleppo when the aḥdāth and the Fatimid troops entered into conflict over control of the city. The aḥdāth consequently allowed Thimal entry on 22 February, forcing the Fatimid troops to barricade themselves in a palace adjacent to the citadel, which was held by al-Dizbari's former ghilmān (slave soldiers). Thimal was able to quickly capture the palace, but only captured the citadel after a seven-month siege, after which he was congratulated by al-Mustansir.

During his siege of the citadel, Thimal sent envoys to Empress Theodora (r. 1042–1056) to gain Byzantine protection in return for recognizing Theodora' suzerainty and offering tribute. Theodora accepted and bestowed upon Thimal the title of magistros, while conferring lower-ranking imperial titles on al-Sayyida al-Alawiyya and six other members of the Mirdasid household. Thimal thus became a vassal of Byzantium in the same way Nasr had been. In Zakkar's estimation, Thimal had been motivated to seek Byzantine protection out of fears that the Fatimids would at one point or another turn against him. Though al-Mustansir confirmed Thimal's governorship in 1045, tensions between Thimal and al-Mustansir increased when the former only partially restored to the Fatimids the 400,000 or 600,000 dinars left in Aleppo's citadel by al-Dizbari. Further straining ties was Thimal's discontinuation of the annual 20,000 dinar tribute to al-Mustansir.

In 1048, al-Mustansir dispatched an army led by the Fatimid governors of Damascus and Homs, Nasir al-Dawla ibn Hamdan and Ja'far ibn Kulayd, respectively, along with auxiliaries from the Banu Kalb, to conquer Aleppo. The Fatimid force captured Hama and Ma'arrat al-Nu'man before defeating Thimal outside of Aleppo, forcing the latter to retreat behind the city walls. In the fall of 1048, Ibn Hamdan encamped his forces at Shildi, a village on the Quwayq River in Aleppo's vicinity for the dual purpose of remaining close to the city and having access to a water supply for his troops. However, he was forced to Damascus as a result of heavy losses in men and equipment incurred when the Quwayq flooded his camp during heavy rains. Due to these natural events, Thimal was spared a potential Fatimid siege. During the 1048 Fatimid campaign, Thimal, suspicious of the loyalties of Aleppo's notable class, detained several notables, including the qadi Ibn Abi Jarada, and personally executed one of them.

Following Ibn Hamdan's withdrawal, Thimal attempted to negotiate a peace with al-Mustansir through the latter's successive Jewish viziers, Sadaqa ibn Yusuf al-Falahi and Abu Sa'd, but both were executed in relatively quick succession. His cousin, Ja'far ibn Kamil, meanwhile went on the offensive and killed Ibn Kulayd at Kafartab, provoking a renewed Fatimid expedition against the Mirdasids. This campaign was led by Rifq at the head of a 30,000-strong army including an uneasy mix of regular Berber troops and Bedouin auxiliaries from the Banu Kalb and Banu Jarrah. The Byzantine emperor unsuccessfully attempted to persuade al-Mustansir to halt the advance and consequently dispatched two armies to oversee developments in northern Syria. To prevent their utilization by the Fatimids, Muqallid demolished the fortifications of Ma'arrat al-Nu'man and Hama. In August 1050, Rifq's forces were annihilated by Thimal's Kilabi troops at Jabal Jawshin and Rifq was detained and fatally wounded.

After his victory, Thimal sought to avoid further conflict and achieve reconciliation with the Fatimids. To that end, he released all their war prisoners and entered into a mediation brokered by the Fatimid qāḍī (judge) of Tyre, Ali ibn Iyad. The latter persuaded al-Mustansir to accept a Mirdasid delegation headed by al-Sayyida al-Alawiyya and including Thimal's young son, Waththab, in late 1050. The delegates paid the caliph 40,000 dinars, which amounted to two years of unpaid tribute. Al-Sayyida al-Alawiyya declared the Mirdasids' loyalty to the Fatimids and beckoned al-Mustansir to "grant peace and protection" to Aleppo. Al-Mustansir subsequently confirmed Thimal's authority over Aleppo and the other territories of his realm.

The peace with the Fatimids contributed to the stability of Thimal's emirate for the next seven years. During this time, Thimal's shaykh al-dawla (chieftain of the state), Ibn al-Aysar, oversaw municipal affairs in Aleppo and was Thimal's principal representative with the Byzantine emperor and the Fatimid caliph. Annual tributes to both rulers were maintained. Unlike his Mirdasid predecessors who relied on Aleppine Christians as their viziers, Thimal entrusted fiscal policy to a succession of viziers from his old powerbase al-Rahba, as well as Mosul: Abu'l Fadl Ibrahim al-Anbari, Abu Nasr Muhammad ibn Jahir and Hibat Allah ibn Muhammad al-Ra'bani al-Rahbi. The latter two were "experts in public finance", according to Bianquis, and had served other Muslim rulers. The inhabitants of Aleppo generally prospered during this period and benefitted from low prices. The city experienced a construction boom in houses, most of which survived until the Mongol destruction of Aleppo in 1260.

=== Vacating the emirate ===
In 1057 and 1058, several domestic and external pressures caused Thimal's rule to become untenable. Among these was a severe drought and failed harvest in the emirate, a new state of war between the Fatimids represented by their expeditionary commander in Syria, Ibn Mulhim, and the Byzantines, and military pressure by al-Basasiri against Aleppo from the east. Thimal's inability to satisfy the financial demands of his tribesmen, the foundation of Mirdasid power, and his conflict with his brother Atiyya, who was based in Balis, caused dissensions against him within the Kilab. The Fatimid vizier al-Yazuri took advantage of Thimal's precarious position and apparent intention to vacate his emirate. The vizier sent the qadi of Tyre, Ibn Aqil, to mediate with Thimal and facilitate his departure. In the ensuing agreement, Thimal stepped down on 23 January 1058 and the Fatimids compensated him with the governorships or appendages of the coastal towns of Acre, Beirut, and Jubayl (Byblos). Ibn Mulhim subsequently became the Fatimid governor of Aleppo. Thimal's rule over the three coastal towns was evidently a tributary arrangement, as he did not exercise control over them and took up residence in Cairo with the blessing of al-Mustansir.

=== Second reign ===
In September 1060, Thimal's nephew, Mahmud ibn Nasr, captured Aleppo from Ibn Mulhim, after defeating a Fatimid expeditionary force led by Nasir al-Dawla ibn Hamdan. In response, Caliph al-Mustansir stripped Thimal of his holdings along the Syrian coast, to which Thimal protested, claiming his innocence of the affairs in Aleppo. He accepted a proposal by the caliph to recognize him as emir of Aleppo once again in return for ousting Mahmud. Thimal departed Cairo and upon reaching Homs, summoned the Kilab to support him. A large part of the tribe heeded his call and marched with him to the gates of Aleppo, which he reached in January 1061. His initial siege was called off upon the arrival of Mahmud's Numayrid reinforcements and a smaller part of the Kilab, with whom Mahmud pursued Thimal and the rest of the Kilab. Thimal defeated Mahmud, who withdrew to Aleppo and appealed for the intervention of the Kilabi chiefs. The latter mediated an end to the fighting whereby Mahmud surrendered Aleppo to Thimal on 23 April in return for significant payment in cash and grain and a yearly salary.

Thimal's second reign was marked by campaigns against the Byzantines and the Numayrids. Against the latter, who had taken control of al-Rahba, Thimal dispatched his brother Atiyya with a Kilabi troop to restore Mirdasid possession of the strategic town in August 1061. After Atiyya captured it, Thimal's Numayrid wife, al-Sayyida al-Alawiyya, reconciled Thimal and the Numayrids under Mani ibn Waththab.

While during his previous reign, Thimal had been an ally and practical vassal of the Byzantines, during his second reign he abandoned this policy in favor of the Fatimids. Zakkar theorizes that this was due to his lengthy stay in Cairo, where he may have come to realize the Fatimids were no longer capable of organizing a serious military campaign against Aleppo, and the Byzantines' preoccupation with Seljuk inroads into Anatolia and Byzantium's possible support for Mahmud in the 1060 fighting. When the Byzantines restored a string of fortresses north of Aleppo around January 1062, Thimal considered this a threat and moved against a Byzantine army at the fortress of Artah in May, which he defeated. Afterward, the Byzantines agreed to dismantle the new fortifications and pay Thimal an annual sum. The Byzantines reneged within a few months and their governor of Antioch conspired with some elements of the Aleppine ahdath against Thimal. The plot was uncovered and prompted Thimal to engage the Byzantines in two small skirmishes in October 1062.

== Death and aftermath ==
Thimal fell ill around this time and invited Atiyya to Aleppo and made the surprise decision to nominate him as his successor. On 28 November 1062, Thimal died "after leading several victorious operations against Byzantine encroachments in the mountains and plateaux situated between Aleppo and Antioch" (as referenced above), in the words of Bianquis. Atiyya took up power to the chagrin of Mahmud, who considered himself the rightful emir of Aleppo. Thimal's death signaled the decline of the Kilabi chiefs' influence over Mirdasid affairs in favor of an emerging force, Turkmen mercenaries under the command of Ibn Khan, who had entered northern Syria shortly following Thimal's death. With their backing, Atiyya held off Mahmud and his Kilabi backers until 1065, when Ibn Khan defected to Mahmud and helped him take over Aleppo.

== Bibliography ==
- Amabe, Fukuzo (2016). Urban Autonomy in Medieval Islam: Damascus, Aleppo, Cordoba, Toledo, Valencia and Tunis. Leiden: Brill. ISBN 9789004315983.
- Bianquis, Thierry (1993). "Mirdās, Banū or Mirdāsids". In Bosworth, C. E.; van Donzel, E.; Heinrichs, W. P. & Pellat, Ch. (eds.). The Encyclopaedia of Islam, Second Edition. Volume VII: Mif–Naz. Leiden: E. J. Brill. pp. 115–123. doi:10.1163/1573-3912_islam_SIM_5220. ISBN 978-90-04-09419-2.
- Zakkar, Suhayl (1971). The Emirate of Aleppo: 1004–1094. Beirut: Dar al-Amanah. OCLC 759803726.

Preceded by Shibl al-Dawla Nasr	Mirdasid emir of Aleppo; 1042–1057	Succeeded by Makin al-Dawla (Fatimid governor)
Preceded by Rashid al-Dawla Mahmud	Mirdasid emir of Aleppo; 1061–1062	Succeeded by Asad al-Dawla Atiyya
