= Rifq =

Abū'l-Faḍl Rifq al-Khādim (c. 970 — 30 August 1049) was a black African eunuch in the court of the Fatimid caliph al-Mustansir (r. 1036–1094) and a commander of the Fatimid army. In 1024, during the reign of Caliph al-Zahir, Rifq led policing expeditions in the Egyptian countryside, earning him a reputation of loyalty. In 1049, he was appointed governor of Damascus in place of Nasir al-Dawla al-Hamdani, and headed a 30,000-strong expedition to assert Fatimid control over Aleppo, then held by the Mirdasid emir Thimal ibn Salih. His army consisted of Berbers, Turks, black Africans and, after it entered Syria, local Bedouin tribes. These diverse and often antagonistic factions quarreled frequently, weakening Rifq's army. After initial clashes with Thimal's troops outside Aleppo, many Bedouin defected and Rifq's officers ultimately deserted him for refusing their counsel. Rifq was captured, received a head injury and died in Mirdasid custody.

== Life ==
=== Service with the Fatimids ===
Abu'l-Fadl Rifq was aged around 80 when he died, according to historian Suhayl Zakkar, implying that he was born circa 970. Information about Rifq largely derives from the contemporary Egyptian historian al-Musabbihi, but also from other sources, including Ibn al-Muqaffa and Ibn Muyassar.

According to historian Thierry Bianquis, Rifq "had his hour of glory in the reign of [Caliph] al-Zahir in 1024". He acquired a reputation as a loyal officer and commanded policing expeditions in the Egyptian countryside, including the Nile Delta. He was relieved of command from operations in the Delta as a result of a dispute between him and Mi'dad, another black eunuch and qa'id (general) of the Fatimid royal regiment. During the early part of Caliph al-Mustansir's reign, Rifq managed the royal palace and supervised the Turkish regiment of the army.

According to an anecdote cited by al-Musabbihi, Rifq was once consulted by an Egyptian Christian man whose Muslim convert son was arrested by the authorities for adorning Christian symbols, an apparent act of apostasy. Rifq advised the man, with whom he had business dealings, to have his son feign insanity to avoid being convicted as an apostate, a capital offense in Fatimid Egypt.

=== Expedition to Syria ===
In 1049, al-Mustansir appointed Rifq the commander of an expedition to subdue Aleppo, which was held by the Mirdasid emir Thimal ibn Salih. The latter discontinued payment of the annual tribute to the caliph, prompting al-Mustansir to dispatch Nasir al-Dawla al-Hamdani to assert Fatimid authority. However, Nasir al-Dawla's army was decimated by the flooding of the Quwayq River, forcing him to retreat to Damascus in October 1048. Al-Mustansir replaced Nasir with Rifq as governor of Damascus and also appointed him governor of Aleppo, should he succeed in subduing that district. Furthermore, the caliph made all the local Fatimid governors in Syria subordinate to him.

Rifq was endowed amīr al-umarāʾ (commander of commanders), along with the additional titles of al-muzaffar ("the victorious"), fakhr al-mulk ("glory of the realm"), and ʿumdat al-dawla wa-ʿimāduhā ("mainstay and pillar of the dynasty"). Before he departed, he was bade farewell by the caliph at the outskirts of Cairo. The army he headed consisted of 30,000 troops, according to Ibn Muyassar, and was composed of Berbers, Turks and Black Africans; these regiments were not only diverse, but often antagonistic as they competed for influence within the Fatimid military and court.

Rifq halted his army at al-Ramla in Palestine after meeting with a Byzantine envoy with a message from Emperor Constantine IX advising al-Mustansir to reconcile with Thimal; if the Fatimids continued their expedition, the emperor promised to give his backing to Thimal, who was a formal vassal of Byzantium. Rifq sent the Byzantine envoy to Cairo and waited for further instructions. Al-Mustansir's vizier, Abu'l-Barakat al-Jarjara'i, delayed the return of the envoy and ordered Rifq to hasten the conquest of Aleppo, intending it to be a crafty response to Emperor Constantine's appeal and warning.

Before he could depart from al-Ramla, Rifq's army became bogged down in raids by the Banu Tayy, a large Bedouin tribe from the area, which seized part of Rifq's equipment and supplies. Instead of attacking the Tayy, Rifq found himself obliged to pay and recruit them as mercenaries. As he continued toward Damascus, he was forced to make similar arrangements with the Banu Kalb and Banu Fazara tribes. The incorporation of Bedouin mercenaries exacerbated the factional tensions within his army, leading to quarrels and infighting between the various regiments, some of whom launched looting raids in the Damascene countryside.

The Fatimid army eventually came together and moved north, capturing Hims then Hama; in both cities, quarreling between the factions took place and Rifq was forced to recruit more local forces. On 24 August 1049, he reached the suburbs of Aleppo "in very bad shape", according to Zakkar. Thimal had long prepared the city's defenses and his forces consisted of his Banu Kilab tribesmen and the city's inhabitants. He was also sent funds from Constantine and had the backing of Antioch-based Byzantine troops on standby.

=== Death in Aleppo ===
On 26 August, Rifq's forces clashed with the Mirdasid forces, during which a regiment of Kalbi mercenaries defected to Thimal. Rifq's officers advised him to withdraw his forces southward to recuperate and punish the chieftains of Tayy and Kalb, who were blamed for the army's poor performance. When Rifq refused these suggestions, the officers advised he appeal for peace with Thimal and issue a diploma in the caliph's name designating Thimal the governorship of Aleppo. Rifq again refused, prompting many of his officers to desert him and withdraw southward. The senior defections, coupled with Rifq's relocation of the army's treasures and provisions to Maarrat Misrin, was taken as a signal by the remainder of the army to desert. Meanwhile, the remaining Bedouin mercenaries began looting the countryside and Rifq was unable to impose order.

The following morning, Rifq and a handful of his soldiers, were captured by Thimal's Bedouin horsemen and taken to Aleppo. At some point, Rifq was wounded in the head, causing him to be in a daze before dying on 30 August. In Zakkar's assessment, "There is no doubt that al-Munstansir built great hopes on the success of this army ... Rifq, who was appointed to lead the expedition, was incompetent ... and, as it proved, lacked military knowledge."

== Bibliography ==
- Ayalon, David (1999). Eunuchs, Caliphs and Sultans: A Study in Power Relationships. Jerusalem: Magnes Press. ISBN 9789654930178.
- Bianquis, Thierry (1989). Dames et la Syrie sous la domination fatimide (359-468/969-1076): essai d'interprétation de chroniques arabes médiévales, Volume 2 (in French). Damascus: Institut française de Damas.
- Lev, Y. (2001). "Aspects of the Egyptian Society in the Fatimid Period". In Vermeulen, U.; van Steenbergen, J. (eds.). Egypt and Syria in the Fatimid, Ayyubid, and Mamluk Eras III: Proceedings of the 6th, 7th and 8th International Colloquium Organized at the Katholieke Universiteit Leuven in May 1997, 1998, and 1999. Leuven: Peeters Publishers. pp. 1–31. ISBN 90-429-0970-6.
- Zakkar, Suhayl (1971). The Emirate of Aleppo: 1004–1094. Aleppo: Dar al-Amanah.
