= Ibn Khan =

Turkmen military leader (died 1070)

Hārūn ibn Malik al-Turk, better known as Ibn Khān (died 1070), was the leader of the first recorded group of free Turkmen troops to enter Syria. Previous groups of Turks that had been present in Syria were slave soldiers and pages and their descendants. Ibn Khan had been invited to Syria to bolster the Mirdasid emir of Aleppo, Atiyya ibn Salih, against his nephew and rival claimant to the emirate, Mahmud ibn Nasr, in 1064.

== Biography ==
=== Origins ===
Information from the medieval sources about “the origin of Ibn Khan is both obscure and insufficient”, according to historian Suhayl Zakkar. The 13th-century Aleppine chronicler Ibn al-Adim holds that Ibn Khan's given name was “Harun” and he was the son of a certain “Malik al-Turk” (king of the Turks), of whom he provides no information. The appellation Ibn Khān translates as “son of a Turkic king”. In Ibn al-Adim's chronicle, Ibn Khan defected from his father due to a quarrel and entered the territory of the Marwanids in Diyar Bakr in the Jazira (Upper Mesopotamia).

=== Military service under the Mirdasids ===
Ibn Khan entered northern Syria in 1064 upon the request of Atiyya ibn Salih, the Mirdasid emir of Aleppo. The latter sought to bolster his strength against his nephew Mahmud ibn Nasr, who claimed the emirate himself and was backed by the Mirdasids’ powerful Arab tribe, the Banu Kilab. Ibn Khan came at the head of 1,000 Turkmen archers, marking the first recorded entry of free Turkmen troops into Syria. Atiyya paid Ibn Khan a monthly salary of 11,000 dinars and settled their troops al-Hadhir, a suburb of Aleppo. Mahmud and the Kilab, meanwhile captured Hama, Maarrat al-Numan and Kafartab in May 1064 and subsequently besieged Aleppo. Ibn Khan and his men relieved Atiyya and entered the city of Aleppo itself where they began to wield significant influence in the emirate's affairs. This came at the expense of the ahdath (urban militia) and Atiyya himself. Following a raid against the Byzantines by Atiyya, the ahdath and Ibn Khan's men, Ibn Khan returned to Aleppo with Atiyya. The latter resented Ibn Khan's presence in the city and found an opportunity to attack him while he was in his troops’ encampment in the suburbs in January 1065. During the night, he had the ahdath pillage Ibn Khan's camp.

As a result of Atiyya's assault, most of Ibn Khan's men were killed. Together with the survivors, Ibn Khan headed for Upper Mesopotamia, but was blocked by the Bedouin groups in the region. He thus headed westward to Sarmin where he met Mahmud and joined his forces. With only a handful of his troops left, he and Mahmud left for Tripoli where Ibn Khan may have replenished his Turkmen forces. The collective name for the mostly Turkmen troops of Ibn Khan may have been the “al-Nawakiya”. The Arabic chroniclers described the latter as groups of mostly Turkmen, but also other non-Arab nomadic groups, who had not submitted to Seljuq authority and migrated to southwestern Syria, Palestine and Byzantine-controlled Anatolia. According to Zakkar, their presence in the Tripoli region possibly predated Ibn Khan's entry into Syria or Ibn Khan belonged to the Nawakiya and had been their paramount chieftain.

Ibn Khan's troops were the most effective force in Mahmud's siege of Aleppo, which ended with Atiyya's defeat in August 1065. Following this, Ibn Khan left for Iraq to recruit more troops and returned to Aleppo in 1066 with about 1,000 Turkmen, Kurdish and Daylamite horsemen. To avoid conflict with the ahdath, Ibn Khan refrained from entering the city and was given the iqta (fief) of Maarrat al-Numan, which he entered with his troops on 10 September 1066. In 1067, Ibn Khan and Mahmud subdued the Bedouin of the Hama plain, who had been assisting Atiyya, who was in nearby Homs at the time. Despite the effectiveness of Ibn Khan against the Bedouin, Mahmud had an uneasy relationship with him as testified in Mahmud's response to Fatimid caliph al-Mustansir’s request to dismiss Ibn Khan from service; Mahmud informed the caliph that he was unable to dismiss Ibn Khan and only employed him to avoid bearing the brunt of the trouble he could cause if independent of Mahmud's authority. He also informed the caliph that he would assist any Fatimid army that could be sent against Ibn Khan.

=== Service in Tyre and death ===
In 1070, Ibn Khan left Aleppo for Tyre, where he entered the service of its governor Ibn Aqil. Ibn Khan likely left Aleppo out of fear of the Seljuq leader Alp Arslan who besieged the city that year. Alp Arslan accused Ibn Khan's brother of influencing Mahmud not to formally pay homage to Seljuq rule, which precipitated the siege. That same year, he was assassinated by his own men in a conspiracy involving Ibn Aqil.

Ibn Khan's nephew Qurlu was recorded as the leader of the Nawakiya Turkmens in 1071, at a time when the group numbered 12,000 horsemen. He had briefly aided Mahmud in his confrontation with Alp Arslan, but withdrew to southwestern Syria, leaving Mahmud with 1,000 Turkmen troops led by Ahmad-Shah.

== Bibliography ==
- Bianquis, Thierry (1993). "Mirdās, Banū or Mirdāsids". In Bosworth, C. E.; van Donzel, E.; Heinrichs, W. P. & Pellat, Ch. (eds.). The Encyclopaedia of Islam, Second Edition. Volume VII: Mif–Naz. Leiden: E. J. Brill. pp. 115–123. doi:10.1163/1573-3912_islam_SIM_5220. ISBN 978-90-04-09419-2.
- Peacock, Andrew C. S. (2010). Early Seljūq History: A New Interpretation. Routledge. ISBN 978-0-415-54853-3.
- Zakkar, Suhayl (1971). The Emirate of Aleppo: 1004–1094. Aleppo: Dar al-Amanah. OCLC 759803726.
