= Battle of Azaz (1030) =

Battle of the Arab–Byzantine wars

Coordinates: 36°34′N 37°00′E

- Part of the Arab–Byzantine wars
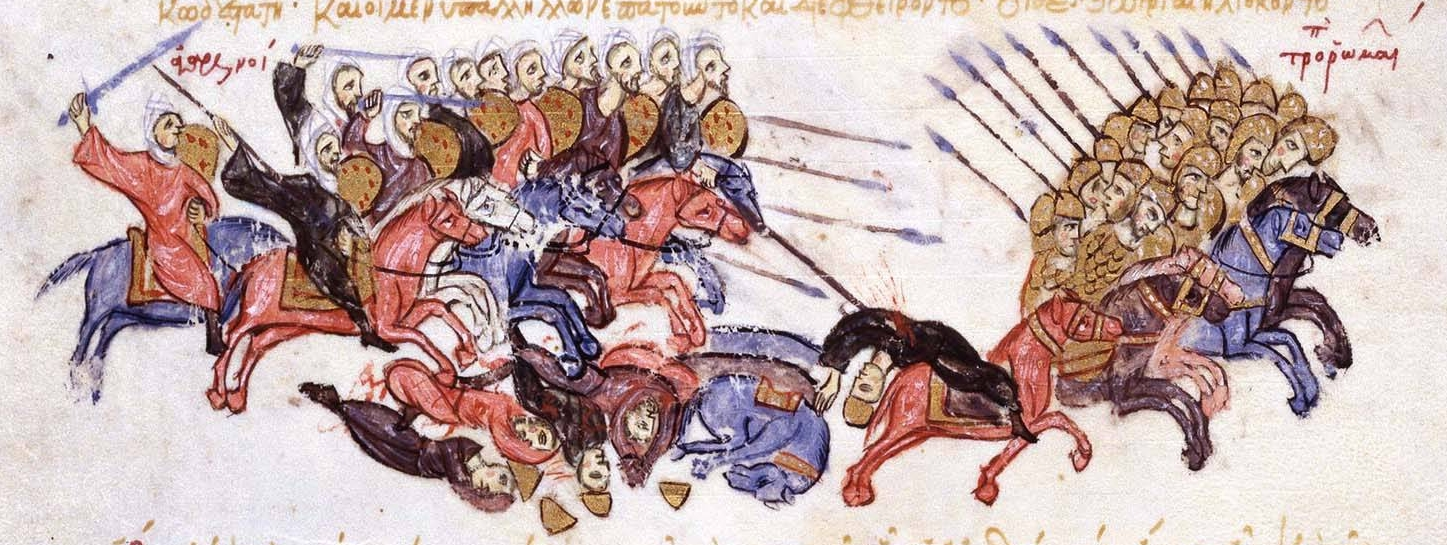
- Miniature from the Madrid Skylitzes showing the Arabs driving the Byzantines to flight at Azaz
| Date | 8–10 August 1030 |
| Location | Azaz, Syria |
| Result | Mirdasid victory |

Belligerents
| Byzantine Empire | Mirdasid Emirate of Aleppo |

Commanders and leaders
| Romanos III Argyros | Shibl al-Dawla Nasr |

Strength
| c. 20,000 (modern estimate) | 700–2,000 |
- Location in modern Syria

The Battle of Azaz was an engagement fought in August 1030 near the Syrian town of Azaz between the Byzantine army, led by Emperor Romanos III Argyros (r. 1028–1034) in person, and the forces of the Mirdasid Emirate of Aleppo, likewise under the personal command of Emir Shibl al-Dawla Nasr (r. 1029–1038). The Mirdasids defeated the much larger Byzantine army and took great booty, even though they were eventually unable to capitalise on their victory.

Aleppo had long been a flashpoint between Byzantium and its Arab neighbours, with the Byzantines claiming a protectorate over the city since 969. In the aftermath of a defeat inflicted on the Byzantine governor of Antioch by the Mirdasids, Romanos launched a campaign against Aleppo. Despite his own inexperience in military matters, Romanos decided to lead the army in person, leading contemporary Byzantine chroniclers to point to a quest for military glory as his primary motivation, rather than the preservation of the status quo. At the head of his army, estimated some 20,000 strong by modern historians, Romanos arrived in Antioch on 20 July 1030. The Mirdasids sent envoys with peace overtures including the payment of tribute, but Romanos, confident of success, rejected them and detained the ambassador. Although his generals urged him to avoid action in the hot and dry Syrian summer, Romanos led his forces forward. The Mirdasid army was considerably smaller, 700–2,000 men according to the sources, but comprised mostly Bedouin light cavalry, which enjoyed superior mobility against their heavily-armoured opponents.

The two armies clashed at Azaz, northwest of Aleppo, where the Byzantines set up camp. The Mirdasids ambushed and destroyed a Byzantine reconnaissance force, and started harassing the imperial camp. Unable to forage, the Byzantines began suffering from thirst and hunger, while an attack on the Mirdasid forces was defeated. Finally, on 10 August, the Byzantine army commenced its withdrawal to Antioch, but it soon collapsed into a chaotic affair. The Arabs used the opportunity to attack the disordered Byzantines, routing them; Emperor Romanos himself only escaped thanks to the intervention of his bodyguard. The scattered remnants of the imperial army gathered at Antioch. Romanos returned to Constantinople, but his generals managed to recover the situation afterwards, putting down Arab rebellions and forcing Aleppo to resume tributary status shortly after in 1031.

== Background ==
The Emirate of Aleppo had been a Byzantine vassal since the 969 Treaty of Safar, but in the years before the death of Basil II (r. 976–1025), its emirs had come under the suzerainty of the Fatimid caliphs of Egypt. By the time the Mirdasid dynasty (1025–1080) gained control of the city, Byzantine influence over Aleppo and northern Syria in general had declined considerably. After the Mirdasid emir Salih ibn Mirdas was killed by the Fatimids at the Battle of al-Uqhuwana in Palestine in 1029, he was succeeded by his young sons Nasr and Thimal. The katepano of Antioch, Michael Spondyles, used the inexperience of Salih's successors as an opportunity to establish a protectorate over the Mirdasid domains. Moreover, Spondyles was provoked by the construction of fortresses by Muslim families in the coastal mountains and religion-motivated clashes between Muslims and Christians in Maarrat al-Nu'man. Without notifying Emperor Romanos III Argyros, Spondyles dispatched a Byzantine force against the Mirdasids, but they were annihilated by the Banu Kilab tribe at Qaybar in July 1029. The Kilab, from which the Mirdasid dynasty sprung, were the most powerful Arab tribe of northern Syria and provided the core of the Mirdasid military.

There are varying accounts regarding Romanos III's motivation for attacking the Mirdasids. According to the medieval Arabic chroniclers Yahya of Antioch (d. 1066) and Ibn al-Adim (d. 1262), Romanos resolved to avenge the defeat of Spondyles, whom he dismissed. On the other hand, the contemporary Byzantine historians John Skylitzes and Michael Psellos hold that the impending campaign was motivated by Romanos's quest for glory. Despite, or rather because of, his complete lack of military experience, Romanos was eager to imitate the deeds of Basil II and his predecessors; according to Psellos, he wanted to emulate the ancient Roman emperors such as Trajan and Augustus, or even Alexander the Great. The modern historian Suhayl Zakkar suggests that all the above versions should be treated with caution, and asserts that Romanos most likely acted to ensure Aleppo's independence from Byzantium's main Arab enemy, the Fatimids, who he believed could conquer the city and its emirate in the wake of Salih's death. This is indicated by the presence in Romanos's entourage of Mansur ibn Lu'lu', a former ruler of Aleppo and antagonist of the Mirdasids, whom Romanos probably sought to install in place of the latter. Moreover, in a letter he sent to Nasr and Thimal, Romanos expressed concern that the Mirdasid emirs' "enemies ... might wrest the city from them" because of their "youthfulness" and requested they hand over Aleppo to him in exchange for a payment.

== Prelude ==
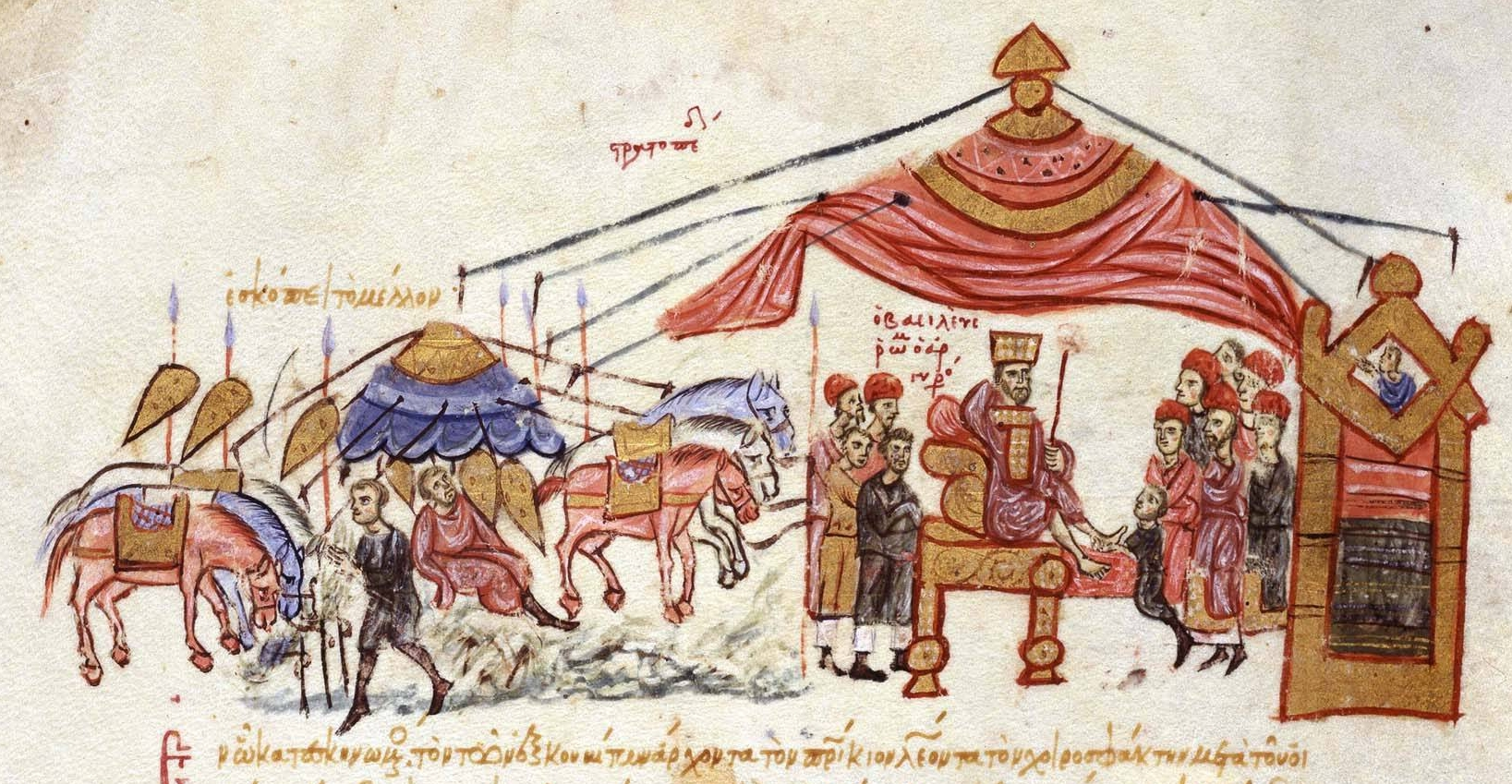
Miniature from the Madrid Skylitzes showing Romanos III encamped near Azaz with his army

In March 1030, Romanos departed Constantinople, leading in person the campaign against Aleppo. According to Psellos, Romanos was so confident of his success that he prepared special crowns for his triumph to come, and staged a grandiose entry into Antioch, which he reached on 20 July. Nasr, learning of the Byzantines' approach, sent envoys, led by his cousin Muqallid ibn Kamil, and offered to recognize Byzantine suzerainty and to restart the payment of tribute. According to Psellos, Nasr's envoys "declared they had not wanted this war, nor had they given him [Romanos] any pretext for it", but "seeing that he was now adopting a policy of threats, and since he insisted in parading his strength" they would prepare for war should Romanos not change direction.

Romanos was encouraged by the Jarrahid chieftain of the Banu Tayy tribe, Hassan ibn Mufarrij, to continue his march; the Jarrahid hoped to use the Emperor's assistance in regaining the pasture territories in Palestine that the Tayy had been forced to give up after their defeat alongside the Mirdasids at al-Uqhuwanah. According to Skylitzes, the Emperor's own generals counselled him to accept Nasr's offer so as to avoid the hazards of campaigning in the arid Syrian desert in the summer, especially as their troops were unaccustomed to such conditions and were encumbered by their heavy armour. This is also reflected in the opinions of modern scholars, who point out that the Kilab, accustomed to the swift movement of the Bedouin nomads, had a distinct advantage over the heavier, slower-moving Byzantine armies.

Persuaded that the expedition against Aleppo would be easily successful, the Emperor rejected his generals' advice: he detained Muqallid and led his army towards Azaz (Azazion in Greek) on 27 July. At the same time, he sent Hassan a spear as a sign of his authority, and ordered him to stand by with his men and await his arrival. Psellos commented on this decision that Romanos "thought war was decided by the big battalions, and it was on the big battalions that he relied". The Byzantine army encamped on a barren plain in the vicinity of Azaz and dug a deep defensive trench around their position. Meanwhile, Nasr and Thimal made their own preparations; they evacuated their families from Aleppo, mobilized the warriors of Kilab and other Bedouin tribes, particularly the Banu Numayr, and, under the call for jihad (holy war), the Muslim inhabitants of Aleppo and its countryside. The majority of the mobilized forces were commanded by Thimal, who safeguarded Aleppo and its citadel. The remaining troops, composed entirely of lightly-armoured Kilabi and Numayri horsemen, were led by Nasr, who set out to confront the Byzantine force.

Arabic accounts of Nasr's troops vary: the Aleppine chroniclers Ibn al-Adim and al-Azimi (d. 1160s) recorded 923 horsemen, Ibn Abi'l-Dam (d. 1244) counted 700, the Egyptian al-Maqrizi (d. 1442) recorded 2,000, while Ibn al-Jawzi (d. 1200) counted 100 horsemen and 1,000 infantry. In Zakkar's view, the latter figure is highly questionable as nearly all sources hold that Nasr's force was made up entirely of cavalry. The Byzantine army is estimated by modern scholars at some 20,000 men and contained many foreign mercenaries. In contrast to their precise counts of Nasr's forces, the Arabic chroniclers record the fantastical figures of 300,000 or 600,000 Byzantine troops.

== Battle ==
The Byzantines set up a fortified camp at Tubbal, near Azaz, and the Emperor dispatched the Excubitors, under their commander, the patrikios Leo Choirosphaktes, to reconnoitre the area. Choirosphaktes was ambushed and taken captive, while most of his men were killed or captured. This success encouraged the Arabs, who on 8 August began to harass the imperial camp, burned down its market—which apparently lay outside the camp's fortifications—and prevented the Byzantines from foraging. As a result, the Byzantine army began to suffer from hunger and especially from thirst. The patrikios Constantine Dalassenos then led an attack against the Arabs, but was defeated and fled back to the camp.

The Byzantines became demoralized, and an imperial council on 9 August resolved to abandon the campaign and return to Byzantine territory. Romanos also ordered his siege engines to be burned. On the following morning, 10 August, the army departed its camp and made for Antioch. Discipline broke down, with Armenian mercenaries using the withdrawal as an opportunity to pillage the camp stores. This caused further chaos among Romanos's troops, with soldiers guarding the trenches fleeing the camp for their personal safety. Nasr used this disorder to lead his Kilabi troops in a surprise dash against the retreating Byzantine force. Psellos wrote that the Arabs attacked in scattered groups, creating the illusion of great numbers, which demoralized the Byzantine army and induced panic in its ranks. As most Byzantine troops were worn out from thirst and dysentery, the imperial army broke and fled.

Accounts of the events differ in the Byzantine sources. According to John Skylitzes, only the imperial bodyguard, the Hetaireia, held firm, and their stand allowed Romanos, who was nearly captured, to escape. On the other hand, Psellos reports that the imperial bodyguard fled and "without so much as a backward glance, they deserted their emperor". While Skylitzes wrote that the Byzantines suffered a "terrible rout" and that some troops were killed by their fellow soldiers in a chaotic stampede, the contemporary Yahya of Antioch reported that the Byzantines suffered remarkably few casualties. According to Yahya, among the higher ranking Byzantine fatalities were two officers, while another officer was captured by the Arabs.

The Arabs took great booty, including the imperial army's entire baggage train, which the Byzantines abandoned in their hasty flight. Among the spoils was the sumptuous imperial tent with its treasures, which allegedly had to be carried off on seventy camels. According to historian Thierry Bianquis, Nasr's Numayri allies alone captured 300 mules carrying gold coins. Only the holy icon of the Theotokos, which traditionally accompanied the Byzantine emperors on campaigns, was saved.

== Aftermath ==
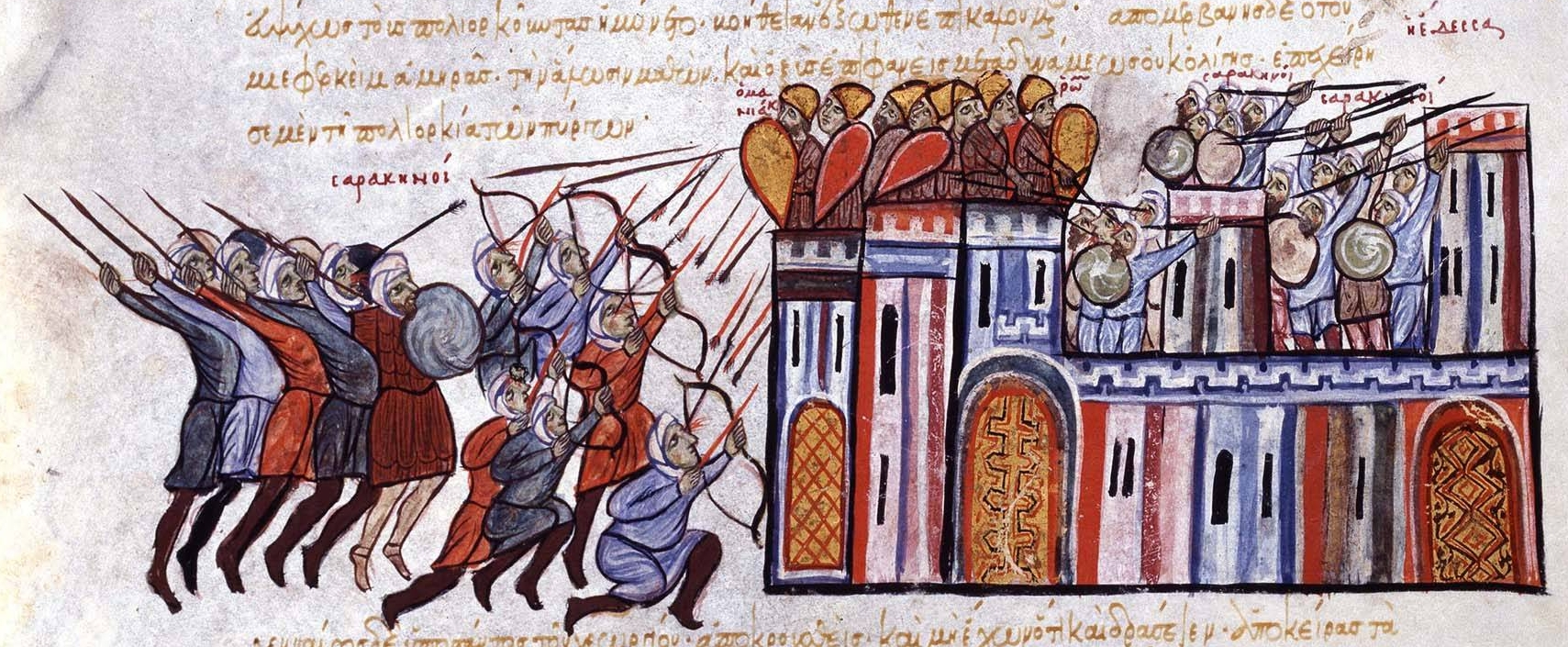
Miniature from the Madrid Skylitzes showing Maniakes defending the citadel of Edessa from the Arabs following its capture

In the event, the Byzantine defeat did not lead to any long-term reversals for Byzantium; neither the Mirdasids, the Fatimids nor the Baghdad-based Abbasid Caliphate were capable of capitalizing on the Arab victory. While Romanos returned to Constantinople, he left behind Niketas of Mistheia and Symeon the protovestiarios as the katepano of Antioch and as Domestic of the Schools respectively, with orders to repeat the expedition later in the year, when the weather was cooler and water more easy to come by. The Fatimids under Anushtakin al-Dizbari tried to exploit the Byzantine reversal by attacking the Jarrahids and their Banu Kalb allies, only to be defeated in battle at Bosra in October.

The Emperor's failure was partly offset by the victory of George Maniakes, governor of Telouch, against 800 Arabs returning from the Byzantine debacle at Azaz. The Arabs, emboldened by their victory, demanded that he evacuate his province. Maniakes at first pretended to comply, sending food and drink to the Arabs, but then attacked and overwhelmed them. Maniakes's success was followed by a sustained Byzantine campaign against the Arab border lords, who had risen up against Byzantine rule in the aftermath of Azaz, and against a Fatimid attempt to capture the border fort of Maraclea. Niketas of Mistheia and Symeon successfully fended off these attacks and in turn captured several fortresses, including Azaz after a short siege in December; Tubbal, where the Byzantines had been defeated months earlier, was burned to the ground. Over the next two years, they systematically took the hill forts of the local tribes and reduced them to submission, restoring the Byzantine position in Syria. The Byzantine resurgence in the east culminated in the capture of Edessa in 1031 by Maniakes.

Meanwhile, Nasr took sole control of Aleppo after ousting Thimal during the latter's absence. The consequent threat posed by Thimal and his supporters among the Kilab prompted Nasr to seek Byzantine forgiveness and protection. Nasr was further threatened by the relocation to the Ruj plain southeast of Antioch of 20,000 tribesmen from the rival Banu Tayy under Hassan ibn Mufarrij and Banu Kalb under Rafi ibn Abi'l-Layl, which was prompted by the invitation of Romanos following his defeat, most likely in 1031. To conciliate his powerful neighbour, Nasr sent his son Amr to Constantinople in April 1031 to ask for a treaty whereby he returned to tributary and vassal status. The treaty entailed an annual tribute of 500,000 dirhams (equivalent to about 8,334 gold dinars) from Nasr to the Byzantines and obliged the Byzantines to support Nasr in case of aggression. This accord led in 1032 to the joint suppression of a Druze revolt in the Jabal al-Summaq by Niketas and Nasr. The prospect of war between the Mirdasid brothers was voided after the chieftains of the Kilab mediated a division of the emirate into a Syrian half controlled by Nasr from Aleppo and a Mesopotamian half ruled by Thimal from al-Rahba.

== See also ==
- Battle of al-Funaydiq

== Sources ==
- Bianquis, T. (1993). "Mirdās". In Bosworth, C. E.; van Donzel, E.; Heinrichs, W. P. & Pellat, Ch. (eds.). The Encyclopaedia of Islam, Second Edition. Volume VII: Mif–Naz. Leiden: E. J. Brill. pp. 115–123. ISBN 978-90-04-09419-2.
- Canard, M. (1965). "D̲j̲arrāḥids". In Lewis, B.; Pellat, Ch. & Schacht, J. (eds.). The Encyclopaedia of Islam, Second Edition. Volume II: C–G. Leiden: E. J. Brill. pp. 482–485. OCLC 495469475.
- Halm, Heinz (2003). Die Kalifen von Kairo: Die Fatimiden in Ägypten, 973–1074 [The Caliphs of Cairo: The Fatimids in Egypt, 973–1074] (in German). Munich: C. H. Beck. ISBN 3-406-48654-1.
- Sewter, Edgar Robert Ashton, ed. (1953). The Chronographia of Michael Psellus. New Haven, Connecticut: Yale University Press. OCLC 422765673.
- Shepard, J. (2010). "Azaz, Battle near". In Rogers, C. (ed.). The Oxford Encyclopedia of Medieval Warfare and Military Technology, Volume 1. Oxford: Oxford University Press. p. 102. ISBN 978-0-19-533403-6.
- Stevenson, William B. (1926). "Chapter VI. Islam in Syria and Egypt (750–1100)". In Bury, J.B. (ed.). The Cambridge Medieval History, Volume V: Contest of Empire and Papacy. New York: The Macmillan Company. pp. 242–264. OCLC 490210837.
- Wortley, John, ed. (2010). John Skylitzes: A Synopsis of Byzantine History, 811–1057. Cambridge: Cambridge University Press. ISBN 978-0-521-76705-7.
- Zakkar, Suhayl (1971). The Emirate of Aleppo: 1004–1094. Beirut: Dar al-Amanah. OCLC 977126570.
