= Nasir al-Dawla Ibn Hamdan =

Nāṣir al-Dawla Abū ʿAlī al-Ḥusayn ibn al-Ḥasan (Arabic: ناصر الدولة أبو علي الحسين بن الحسن), better known by his honorific epithet as Nasir al-Dawla Ibn Hamdan, was a descendant of the Hamdanid dynasty who became a general of the Fatimid Caliphate, ruing Egypt as a de facto dictator in 1071–1073.

== Origin ==
Nasir al-Dawla was a grandson of Abu Abdallah al-Husayn ibn Nasir al-Dawla, a Hamdanid prince who had fled to the Fatimid Caliphate when Mosul had been taken over by the Uqaylid dynasty in 990, serving as governor of Tyre. Nasir al-Dawla's father, al-Hasan, served as governor of Damascus in 1041–1048, in succession to Anushtakin al-Dizbari. As al-Husayn was appointed to the same office in 1058 and carried the same honorific of 'Nasir al-Dawla', as his father, the medieval historian Ibn al-Qalanisi confused the two, followed by some modern historians as well, who attribute to al-Husayn his father's governorship as well.

As a young man, Nasir al-Dawla was received by the Fatimid caliph al-Zahir in Cairo.

== Political and Military career ==
Nasir al-Dawla was appointed governor of Alexandria, where he expelled the rebellious Bedouin Abu Qurra clan from the western Nile Delta. In 1060, as governor of Damascus, Nasir al-Dawla led a campaign against the Mirdasid Emirate of Aleppo, where Mahmud ibn Nasr had tried to seized power from the Fatimid governor, Ibn Mulhim. In the Battle of al-Funaydiq he was defeated and captured, resulting in the definitive loss of Aleppo to the Mirdasids. During the battle, Nasir al-Dawla suffered a wound to his arm that left it paralysed. His captor, the Banu Numayr chieftain Mani, later sold him to Mahmud for 2,700 gold dinars. He was released shortly after, as Mahmud tried to gain Fatimid support against his uncle, Mu'izz al-Dawla Thimal, who was seeking to recover control of Aleppo.

== Mustansirite era civil war ==
Nasir al-Dawla played a leading role in the civil war of 1066 to 1073 between the Fatimids' Turkish and Nubian troops as the leader of the former. In this struggle, he requested the assistance of the Seljuks and even tried to abolish the Fatimid caliph al-Mustansir and restore allegiance to the Abbasids. He succeeded in becoming master of Cairo and reduced al-Mustansir to a powerless puppet, while his Turks plundered the palace and the treasury. These actions were blamed for the subsequent Mustansirite Hardship. His increasingly tyrannical regime led to a split and he was ousted for a time, but was able to regain control of Cairo in 1071/2. His rule was ended with the murder of himself and his family in March/April 1073. The anarchic conditions in the country continued until al-Mustansir called upon the governor of Palestine, Badr al-Jamali, for aid in late 1073. who was able to put an end to the civil war.

== Sources ==
- Bianquis, Thierry (1989). Damas et la Syrie sous la domination fatimide (359-468/969-1076). Deuxième tome (in French). Presses de l’Ifpo. doi:10.4000/books.ifpo.6458. ISBN 978-2-35159-526-8.
- Canard, Marius (1971). "Ḥamdānids". In Lewis, B.; Ménage, V. L.; Pellat, Ch. & Schacht, J. (eds.). The Encyclopaedia of Islam, Second Edition. Volume III: H–Iram. Leiden: E. J. Brill. pp. 126–131. OCLC 495469525.
- Halm, Heinz (2003). Die Kalifen von Kairo: Die Fatimiden in Ägypten, 973–1074 [The Caliphs of Cairo: The Fatimids in Egypt, 973–1074] (in German). Munich: C. H. Beck. ISBN 3-406-48654-1.
- Lev, Yaacov (1987). "Army, Regime, and Society in Fatimid Egypt, 358–487/968–1094". International Journal of Middle East Studies. 19 (3): 337–365. doi:10.1017/S0020743800056762. JSTOR 163658. S2CID 162310414.
- Lev, Yaacov (1991). State and Society in Fatimid Egypt. Leiden: Brill. ISBN 9789004093447.
