= Atiyya ibn Salih =

Mirdasid emir

Emir of Aleppo
- Reign: Late 1062 – August 1065
- Predecessor: Thimal ibn Salih
- Successor: Mahmud ibn Nasr
- Died: July 1073; Constantinople
- Issue: Unknown
Names
- Abū Dhūʿaba ʿAṭiyya ibn Ṣāliḥ ibn Mirdās
Regnal name
- Asad al-Dawla
- Tribe: Banu Kilab
- Dynasty: Mirdasid
- Father: Salih ibn Mirdas
- Mother: Tarud

Asad al-Dawla Abū Dhūʿaba ʿAṭiyya ibn Ṣāliḥ (Arabic: عطية بن صالح بن مرداس; died July 1073) was the Mirdasid emir of Aleppo in 1062–1065. Prior to his assumption of the emirate in Aleppo, he had been the Mirdasid emir of al-Rahba from 1060. He continued as the emir of al-Rahba and the eastern portion of the Mirdasid realm after losing Aleppo to his nephew Mahmud ibn Nasr. He lost al-Rahba in 1070. He entered Byzantine protection afterward and launched a failed assault against Mahmud's territories before his death in Constantinople.

== Family ==
Atiyya was the son of Salih ibn Mirdas, who established Mirdasid rule in Aleppo in 1024, and his wife Tarud. The latter was noted in contemporary sources for her beauty. Both Salih and Tarud belonged to the Banu Kilab, a large Arab tribe that dominated northern Syria and the western Jazira in the 11th century. In 1014, Salih had been forced to divorce Tarud during his incarceration by the emir of Aleppo, Mansur ibn Lu'lu' so that the latter could wed her. Salih later defeated Mansur and remarried Tarud. It is not known if Atiyya was born before or after these events. However, his name ʿAṭiyya ("the Gift") suggests he was born after Salih and Tarud remarried, according to historian Suhayl Zakkar. Atiyya's older brothers Nasr and Thimal were born to a different mother.

== Emir of al-Rahba ==
Nasr and Thimal jointly succeeded Salih as emir of Aleppo after Salih's death in 1029, but Nasr ultimately took sole control of the city in 1030, while Thimal was relegated to the fortress of al-Rahba on the Euphrates River in the western Jazira. After Nasr's death in 1038, the Fatimid Caliphate's governor in Syria, Anushtakin al-Dizbari, conquered Aleppo and proceeded to take over the entire Mirdasid emirate, seizing Balis and Manbij but failing to capture al-Rahba. Al-Dizbari died in Aleppo in 1042, after which Thimal retook Aleppo. He allied with the Fatimids and handed over control of al-Rahba to the pro-Fatimid general Arslan al-Basasiri so that the latter could use it as a launching point to invade Abbasid Iraq. When al-Basasiri was defeated and killed in 1060, Fatimid influence in the western Jazira took a blow and Atiyya was able to seize al-Rahba, where he found the treasures and arsenal stored by al-Basasiri in preparation of the war on the Abbasids. At some point prior to his conquest of al-Rahba, Atiyya had taken control of Balis.

At the time of Atiyya's capture of al-Rahba, Thimal had given up control of Aleppo to the Fatimids in exchange for the governorship of the coastal districts of Acre, Beirut and Jubayl. The Banu Kilab insisted on the Mirdasids’ return to Aleppo and entrusted Atiyya's nephew Mahmud ibn Nasr with taking back the city. The ahdath (urban militia) of Aleppo allowed the Banu Kilab to enter the city in July 1060, but the Fatimid army held onto the citadel and Fatimid troops were sent to evict the Banu Kilab. The Fatimid troops were defeated in August 1060 and Atiyya took control of the citadel. Two days later control passed to Mahmud.

As a consequence of the Fatimids’ loss of Aleppo, Thimal was stripped of his coastal districts and sought to take over Aleppo from his nephew Mahmud. Thimal reached an agreement with Mahmud brokered by the latter's mother al-Sayyid al-Alawiyya and the sheikhs (chieftains) of the Banu Kilab that restored Thimal's rule in 1061. Atiyya, meanwhile, became independent in his emirate of al-Rahba.

== Emir of Aleppo ==
In a surprise move, Thimal chose Atiyya as his successor rather than Mahmud, who had the backing of the sheikhs of Banu Kilab and his maternal kinsmen, the Banu Numayr. Mahmud contested Atiyya's succession after Thimal's death in late 1062. The two sides fought each other in July 1063, but neither gained the decisive edge. Instead, a truce was arbitrated, giving Atiyya control of Aleppo and the eastern half of the emirate stretching from al-Rahba in the southeast to Qinnasrin in the northwest and northward to Azaz. Mahmud was given the western portion of the emirate.

Atiyya rejected the division of the Mirdasid emirate and brought in 1,000 Turkmen archers led by their prince, Ibn Khan, to assist him against Mahmud and his supporters and extract more concessions from them. This marked the first recorded entry of free Turkmen troops into northern Syria, as opposed to Turkish slave-soldiers. The Turkmens proved unruly and Atiyya subsequently had the ahdath of Aleppo pillage Ibn Khan's camp in al-Hadir. Many of the Turkmens were killed and Ibn Khan defected to Mahmud. Together they defeated Atiyya at Marj Dabiq in 1065. They proceeded to besiege Atiyya in Aleppo for three months before Atiyya surrendered in August. Mahmud entered Aleppo, and a new arrangement was reached that gave Atiyya control of the eastern emirate, i.e., the western Jazira including al-Rahba, while Mahmud controlled the western emirate including Aleppo, Jund Qinnasrin (Chalcis District) and a significant portion of Jund Hims (Homs District).

== Later campaigns and death ==
The Fatimids apparently encouraged Atiyya to assault Mahmud, prompting the latter and Ibn Khan to attack Homs and Hama in 1067 in preparation for an assault on al-Rahba. Direct hostilities were avoided after the qadi (chief Islamic judge) of Tripoli, Ibn Ammar, mediated between Atiyya and Mahmud. The Fatimids formally recognized the division of the Mirdasid emirate reached in 1065. However, Atiyya still laid claim on Homs, a town held by Mahmud. During his attempt to capture the city, in 1068, his al-Rahba headquarters was seized by the Uqaylid emir Muslim ibn Quraysh. Atiyya took up residence in Fatimid-controlled Damascus and lost his last possession, al-Raqqa, to Ibn Quraysh in 1070/71.

After Atiyya's requests for military assistance from the Fatimids to restore his emirate were rebuffed, he sought the aid of the Byzantines. With support of their troops in Antioch, he launched a raid on Ma'arrat Misrin in Mahmud's emirate in 1071. The raid was apparently of little consequence. The Byzantines supported Atiyya's activities in the aftermath of their defeat at the Battle of Manzikert and their aim was to weaken or expel the Turkmen troops of the emirate. Afterward, he took refuge in the Byzantine capital at Constantinople where he died in July 1073, after falling asleep on a roof while drunk and then falling from it. His corpse was taken to Aleppo for burial.

== Bibliography ==
- Amabe, Fukuzo (2016). Urban Autonomy in Medieval Islam: Damascus, Aleppo, Cordoba, Toledo, Valencia and Tunis. Leiden: Brill. ISBN 9789004315983.
- Bianquis, Thierry (1989). Damas et la Syrie sous la domination fatimide (359-468/969-1076). Deuxième tome (in French). Presses de l’Ifpo. doi:10.4000/books.ifpo.6458. ISBN 978-2-35159-526-8.
- Bianquis, Thierry (1993). "Mirdās, Banū or Mirdāsids". In Bosworth, C. E.; van Donzel, E.; Heinrichs, W. P. & Pellat, Ch. (eds.). The Encyclopaedia of Islam, Second Edition. Volume VII: Mif–Naz. Leiden: E. J. Brill. pp. 115–123. doi:10.1163/1573-3912_islam_SIM_5220. ISBN 978-90-04-09419-2.
- Zakkar, Suhayl (1971). The Emirate of Aleppo: 1004–1094. Aleppo: Dar al-Amanah. OCLC 759803726.

Preceded by Mu'izz al-Dawla Thimal	Emir of Aleppo; Late 1062–August 1065	Succeeded by Rashid al-Dawla Mahmud
