= Ibn Mulhim =

10th century Arab leader

Makin al-Dawla Al-Hasan ibn Ali ibn Mulhim al-Uqayli
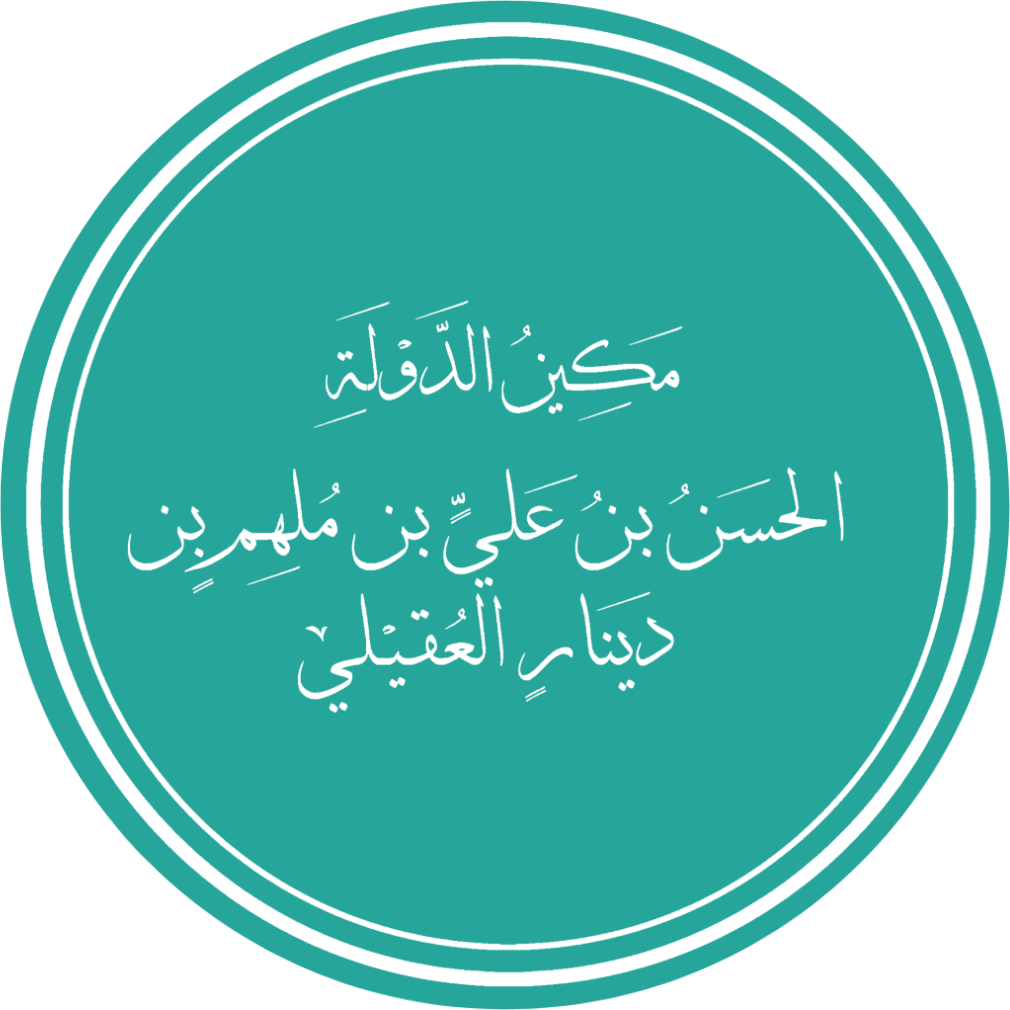
- A decorative seal of Ibn Mulhim's full name

Fatimid Governor of Aleppo
- In office August 1058 – April 1060
- Appointed by: Al-Mustansir
- Preceded by: Mu'izz al-Dawla Thimal
- Succeeded by: Asad al-Dawla Atiyya

Makīn al-Dawla al-Ḥasan ibn ʿAlī ibn Mulhim ibn Dīnār al-ʿUqaylī (Arabic: مكين الدولة الحسن بن علي بن ملهم بن دينار العقيلي) (fl. 1053–1062), also known as Ibn Mulhim, was a Fatimid general who led the Fatimid reconquest of Ifriqiya and expeditions in Syria. He served as the governor of Aleppo in 1058–1060 and military governor of Jund al-Urdunn in 1062.

== Biography ==
=== Origins ===
Ibn Mulhim belonged to the Arab tribe of Banu Uqayl. The tribe made its own home in the Syrian steppe, from Hawran in the south to the Euphrates valley in the north during the Qarmatian period in the late 9th century. Ibn Mulhim's grandfather, Mulhim ibn Dinar, served as a governor of the Hawran and Bathaniyya subdistricts of Jund Dimashq (Damascus District) during the reign of Abu al-Misk Kafur (r. 966–968), ruler of the Egypt-based Ikhshidid dynasty. Ibn Mulhim's uncle, Abu’l-Qays Hamid ibn Mulhim later served as governor of Jund Dimashq in 1009 during the reign of the Egypt-based Fatimid caliph al-Hakim.

=== Military career ===
Ibn Mulhim entered the service of the Fatimids and was dispatched by the vizier Abu Muhammad al-Yazuri to conquer Ifriqiya from its Zirid ruler al-Mu'izz ibn Badis. The vizier had previously encouraged the nomadic Banu Hilal clans of Riyah and Zughba to invade Zirid territory, prompting Ibn Badis to launch a counteroffensive in which his forces were routed at the Battle of Haydaran. The Hilali clans fought over the booty and Ibn Mulhim was sent to settle the dispute, after which he utilized their Bedouin warriors to besiege Kairouan, the Zirid capital. With Ibn Badis confined to Kairouan, Ibn Mulhim set about to conquer the rest of the region, capturing Gabes and most of the Ifriqiyan countryside. A leader of the Sanhaja, the Berber confederation whose cavalry formed the backbone of the Zirid military, defected to Ibn Mulhim and was appointed governor of Gabes, while the chieftain of the Riyah was made governor of the countryside. Ibn Mulhim returned to Cairo bringing with him several Ifriqiyan noblemen ready to offer their allegiance to the Fatimid caliph al-Mustansir (r. 1036–1094) and the caliph's share of the booty from Haydaran. He was received with pomp and honors.

In 1055, Ibn Mulhim was sent on an expedition by al-Yazuri against the Byzantine Empire’s territory in the northern coastal strip of Syria near Antioch. This came in response to the refusal of the Byzantine empress Theodora to Egypt's request for grain amid a severe shortage. However, the Byzantine navy countered the Fatimid army and took Ibn Mulhim captive. After Theodora's death in July 1056, the Byzantine alliance with the Fatimids was renewed and Ibn Mulhim was released. He resumed command of the Fatimid army in northern Syria and was made governor of Aleppo in 1058 after its Mirdasid emir, Thimal ibn Salih, agreed to exchange it for the governorships of Beirut and Acre. Aleppo was restored to Thimal in 1060 and the latter's governorship over Acre passed to Ibn Mulhim. He was also made governor of Tiberias. In effect, he was the military governor of Jund al-Urdunn (Jordan District). Ibn Mulhim was additionally put in charge of the district's resident Arab tribes, the Banu Fazara and Banu Sulaym, both of which belonged to the Qays confederation as the Banu Uqayl.

== Bibliography ==
- Bianquis, Thierry (1989). Damas et la Syrie sous la domination fatimide (359-468/969-1076): essai d'interprétation de chroniques arabes médiévales, Volume 2. Institut française de Damas.
- Brett, Michael (2017). Fatimid Empire. Edinburgh University Press. ISBN 978-0-7486-4077-5.
- Gil, Moshe (1997) [1983]. A History of Palestine, 634–1099. Translated by Ethel Broido. Cambridge: Cambridge University Press. ISBN 0-521-59984-9.

Preceded by Mu'izz al-Dawla Thimal	Emir of Aleppo; August 1058–April 1060	Succeeded by Asad al-Dawla Atiyya
