= Qibar =

Qibar (Al-Hawa)
- Village
- Location within Syria
- Coordinates: 36°31′30″N 36°54′37″E
- Country: Syria
- Governorate: Aleppo Governorate
- District: Afrin District
- Subdistrict: Afrin

Population (2004 census)
  - Total: 743
- Time zone: UTC+2 (EET)
  - Summer (DST): UTC+3 (EEST)
- Area code: Q16120856 - الهوى

Qibar (alternatively spelled Qaybar, Qeibar or Qibare), officially called al-Hawa (Arabic: الهوى), is a village in northwestern Syria in the Afrin District of the Aleppo Governorate. The village is also known as Arshqibar (Arsha wa Qibar) as it absorbed the adjacent village of 'Arsha. It is located in the plain of Jouma (Guma) at an elevation of 360 meters above sea level. Nearby localities include Afrin city to the west and Maryamin to the west, while Aleppo is 40 kilometers to the northwest.

According to the Syria Central Bureau of Statistics (CBS), Qibar had a population of 743 in the 2004 census. The population in 2016, during the Syrian Civil War, was estimated at over 6,000. In 2009, researcher Fermaz Gheribo recorded seventy Yazidi families in the village and author Sebastian Maisel asserts half of the families in the village are Yazidis. It serves as the traditional seat of the chief Yazidi family of the Afrin area, the Darwish clan. The name of the village was officially changed to "al-Hawa" during the Arabization campaign of President Hafez al-Assad during the 1970s.

The vicinity of Qibar contains abundant archaeological remains from ancient settlements and several caves containing ancient inscriptions. There are three nearby Yazidi shrines, namely the Cave of Cilmera, Melekadi Shrine and Hercerka Sheikh Huseyn Shrine. The village was the scene of a battle between the Byzantines and the Arabs which preceded the Battle of Azaz in 1030. The medieval Syrian geographer Yaqut al-Hamawi mentioned the village in his 13th-century work. For ten years during French Mandatory rule in Syria, a Yazidi school operated in Qibar with a Christian and a Yazidi teacher and a Yazidi religious instructor from Sinjar.

== Bibliography ==
- Maisel, Sebastian (2017). Yezidis in Syria: Identity Building among a Double Minority. Lanham, Maryland: Lexington Books. ISBN 9780739177747.
