= Al-Basasiri =

Turkish slave-soldier and Buyid military commander (died 1059)

Abuʾl-Ḥārith Arslān al-Muẓaffar al-Basāsīrī (died 15 January 1059) was a Turkoman slave-soldier (mamlūk) who rose to become a military commander of the Buwayhid dynasty in Iraq. When the Seljuks ousted the Buwayhids in 1055, he transferred his allegiance to the Fatimid Caliphate of Egypt, in whose name he conquered Baghdad (1058), which he ruled for almost a year.

== Early years ==
The name al-Basāsīrī (or al-Fasāsīrī, al-Fasāwī) is a nisba derived from his first owner's place of origin, Basā (Fasā) in the province of Fars. Abuʾl-Ḥārith is a kunya, while his ism (given name) was the Turkish Arslān. He became a freedman (mawlā) of the Buwayhid emir Baha al-Dawla (r. 988–1012). His military career, however, can be traced only from the reign of Baha's son, Jalal al-Dawla (r. 1025–1044).

During this time, al-Basasiri took part in Jalal's conflicts with his nephew, Abu Kalijar, the emir of Fars, and with the rival Uqaylid dynasty of Mosul. He was also a favourite of the Buwayhid emir al-Malik al-Rahim (r. 1048–1055), from whom he received the town of Anbar as a fief. This period saw growing unrest among the Turkish troops in Baghdad, growing strife between Sunni and Shi'a, constant Kurdish raiding, and the ongoing war with the Uqaylids.

== Conflict with the vizier, 1054–55 ==
In 1054, al-Basasiri was unable to prevent Turkish troops from rioting and looting in Baghdad. In the same year, the Uqaylid leader Quraysh raided Baradan and carried off al-Basasiri's camels and horses. In November, Quraysh captured Anbar and formally renounced Buwayhid lordship, ordering the Seljuk sultan Tughrul to be named in the public sermon (khuṭba) during Friday prayer.

According to Ibn al-Athir's Complete History, "the estrangement of the [Abbasid] caliph and Basasiri began this year in Ramadan", that is, between 4 December 1054 and 2 January 1055. In 1054, al-Basasiri fell out with the caliphal vizier Ibn al-Muslima over Turkish policy. He accused the vizier of being in contact with Tughrul since 1052/3. Ibn al-Muslima, in turn, blocked al-Basasiri's efforts to combat Quraysh's supporters in Baghdad. In retaliation, al-Basasiri impounded the vizier's boat and cut off his monthly stipend. He also cut off the caliph al-Qa'im's monthly subsidy.

In March 1055, al-Basasiri reconquered Anbar. On his way he plundered the villages of Dimimma and Fallujah. His brother-in-law, Dubays I of the Mazyadid dynasty, joined him. The Uqaylid client Abu'l-Ghana'im ibn al-Muhallaban defended Anbar. Employing trebuchets and Greek fire, al-Basasiri destroyed a tower and some defensive works, storming the town and capturing Abu'l-Ghana'im and a hundred Khafaja soldiers.

Conflict with the vizier continued after al-Basasiri's return to Baghdad. In July 1055, during a Sunni protest, the vizier convinced some fanatics to board a ship and break some wine jars belonging to a Christian merchant and destined for al-Basasiri, who was then staying with the Buwayhid sultan at Wasit. Because the wine had belonged to a Christian, al-Basasiri was able to obtain a Hanadi legal ruling (fatwā) declaring the vizier's actions illegal. Ibn al-Muslima then denounced him as having Shi'a sympathies and being in contact with the Abbasids' rivals, the Shi'a Fatimid Caliphate. He turned the Turkish troops and the caliph against him, and had his house in Baghdad burnt down. In fact, although the Fatimid chief missionary al-Mu'ayyad fi'l-Din al-Shirazi wrote to al-Basasiri, his letters did not reach him until after the arrival of Tughrul in Baghdad.

Ibn al-Muslima ordered the sultan al-Malik al-Rahim to send his favourite away, but the sultan refused. On 15 December 1055, the name of Tughrul, who was nominally passing through on his pilgrimage (ḥajj) to Mecca, was pronounced in the khuṭba in Baghdad. On 18 December, he solemnly entered the city. The presence of his troops sparked disorders, and he arrested the Buwayhid sultan on 23 December for failing to control the people. Although al-Malik al-Rahim returned to Baghdad from Wāsiṭ to greet Tughrul, al-Basasiri went to the court of Dubays, his brother-in-law. Tughrul ordered Dubays to disassociate with al-Basasiri, and the latter went to Rahba.

== In Fatimid service against the Seljuks, 1055–59 ==
=== Governor of Rahba ===
From Rahba, al-Basasiri wrote to the Fatimid caliph al-Mustansir (r. 1036–1094) for permission to come to Cairo and for assistance in defending Syria and Egypt from the Seljuks. The Fatimid vizier al-Yazuri refused the first request, but granted the second. The caliph appointed al-Basasiri as governor of Rahba and sent him 500000 gold dinars, clothing valued at 500000 dinars, 10000 bows, 1000 swords, 500 horses, and a quantity of lances and arrows. Al-Mu'ayyad accompanied the supplies and brought the letter of investiture.

In 1056–57, al-Mu'ayyad won several Syrian and Iraqi emirs over to the Fatimid cause. Dubays, al-Basasiri's former protector, who had submitted to Tughrul, changed allegiance and had the Fatimid caliph's name pronounced in the khuṭba. He renewed his alliance with al-Basasiri. The Baghdadi Turks, who had been a thorn in al-Basasiri's side in previous years, found the rule of Tughrul intolerable and joined al-Basasiri in Syria. The army of al-Basasiri and Dubays, reinforced by the Turks and some Bedouin, marched on Sinjar, where they defeated a Seljuk force under Qutalmish and Quraysh. While Qutalmish escaped capture and fled to Adharbayjan, Quraysh was injured and surrendered on 9 January 1057.

After his victory at Sinjar, al-Basasiri entered Mosul, and the city declared for the Fatimid caliph. This situation only lasted a few days. Tughrul soon recaptured Mosul and set about devastating the region of Sinjar, while al-Basasiri retreated to Rahba. Dubays and Quraysh temporarily switched sides again, but the anti-Arab sentiment in the Seljuk camp repulsed them. Dubays went to Jami'an, and Quraysh joined al-Basasiri at Rahba.

In early 1058, Tughrul's brother Ibrahim Inal agreed with al-Basasiri and al-Mu'ayyad that the latter would support him in usurping his brother's throne, and he would proclaim the name of the Fatimid caliph in the khuṭba. He abandoned Mosul to al-Basasiri, who still had to spend four months besieging the citadel before it surrendered. After capturing the citadel, al-Basasiri retired to Rahba. Again, his victory did not last. Tughrul soon retook Mosul and marched on Nisibis, while al-Basasiri retreated to Damascus.

=== Conquest of Baghdad ===
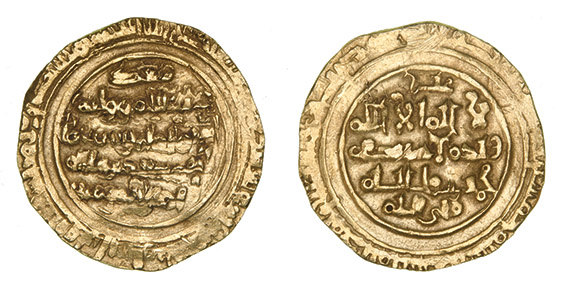
Gold dinar struck in al-Mustansir's name by al-Basasiri in Baghdad

During al-Basasiri's retreat, Ibrahim rose in revolt in the Jibal. Tughrul's response largely denuded Iraq of Seljuk troops, allowing al-Basasiri to launch an invasion. He quickly took Hit and Anbar. On 27 December 1058, he entered Baghdad with 400 mamlūk cavalry, accompanied by Quraysh and his 200 cavalry. The next Friday, 1 January 1059, the Shi'a call to worship (adhān) was announced in western Baghdad, which was predominantly Shi'a. On 8 January, al-Basasiri crossed the Tigris and occupied eastern Baghdad, having the Fatimid caliph's name pronounced in the Great Mosque. There were skirmishes in the streets throughout the following week. On 19 January, the Hasani Palace came under assault, and the Abbasid caliph al-Qa'im placed himself and his household under the protection of Quraysh. On 29 January, al-Basasiri celebrated the Feast of the Sacrifice in the prayer space (muṣallā) outside the Great Mosque with Fatimid banners flying.

As the new authority in Baghdad, al-Basasiri gained control of the Abbasid insignia, the turban (mindīl), cloak (ridāʾ), and lattice screen (shibbāk). He allowed Quraysh to retain custody of al-Qa'im, who was removed from the city and confined at Haditha, but ordered him to hand over the vizier Ibn al-Muslima, whom he paraded through the streets and executed on 16 February 1059.

After his conquest of Baghdad, al-Basasiri took Wasit and Basra. His invasion of Khuzistan, however, was repelled. The ruler of Khuzistan, Hazarasp ibn Bankir, asked Dubays to mediate with al-Basasiri. He offered to pay tribute to al-Basasiri, but the latter refused, demanding that the khuṭba and the coinage be in the name of the Fatimid caliph. Hazarasp refused this. When al-Basasiri realised that he was receiving troops from Tughrul, he made peace with him and retired to Wasit, which he reached on 12 September 1059.

In July 1059, Tughrul defeated his brother. He offered to leave al-Basasiri in power in Baghdad, provided that he could have the khuṭba and the coinage in his name and the Abbasid caliph's restoration. The caliph refused al-Basasiri's attempt to pry al-Qa'im away from the Seljuks. Quraysh tried to convince al-Basasiri to accept Tughrul's authority, but he refused. Tughrul marched on Baghdad, and al-Basasiri abandoned the city with his family on 14 December 1059. Tughrul and the Abbasid caliph entered it on 4 January 1060. The Fatimid name was said to have been pronounced in the khuṭba in Baghdad's mosques forty times, meaning that the rule of al-Basasiri in Baghdad lasted forty Fridays.

After heading towards Kufa, al-Basasiri joined up with Dubays. When the Seljuk cavalry overtook them, Dubays fled, but al-Basasiri offered battle. On 15 January, at Saḳy al-Furat near Kufa, he was defeated and killed. His horse was first killed under him by an arrow, and he was then killed by the clerk of the Seljuk vizier al-Kunduri, who had his head brought to Tughrul at Baghdad.

== Sources ==
- Canard, Marius (1960). "al-Basāsīrī". In Gibb, H. A. R.; Kramers, J. H.; Lévi-Provençal, E.; Schacht, J.; Lewis, B. & Pellat, Ch. (eds.). The Encyclopaedia of Islam, Second Edition. Volume I: A–B. Leiden: E. J. Brill. pp. 1073–1075. OCLC 495469456.
- Daftary, Farhad (2007). The Ismāʿı̄lı̄s: Their History and Doctrines (Second ed.). Cambridge: Cambridge University Press. ISBN 978-0-521-61636-2.
- Richards, D. S., ed. (2000). The Annals of the Saljuq Turks: Selections from al-Kamil fi'l-Ta'rikh of Ibn al-Athir. Abingdon and New York: Routledge.
