= Mirdasid dynasty =

Emirate of Aleppo dynasty from 1014 to 1080

Mirdasid dynasty مرداسيون
- 1014–1080
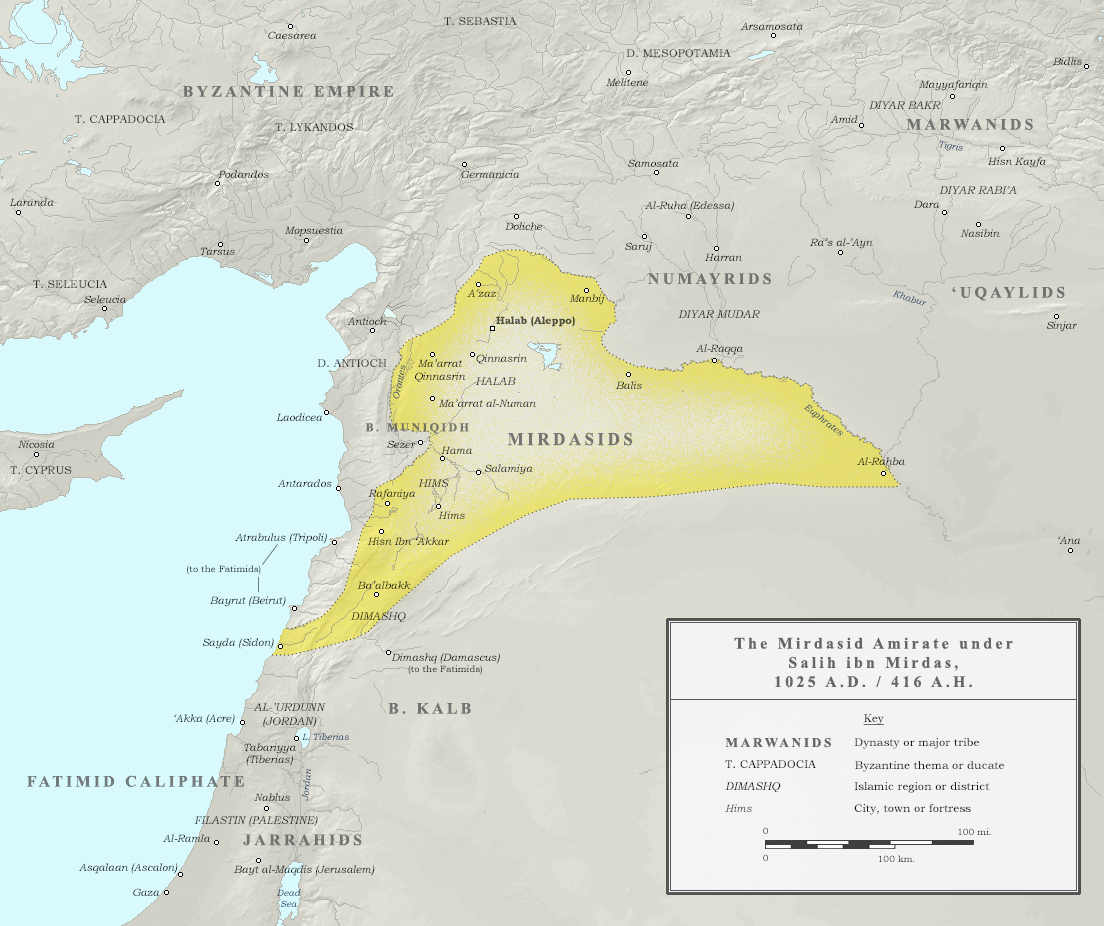
- Map of the Mirdasid emirate at its zenith during the rule of Salih ibn Mirdas in 1025
- Capital: Al-Rahba (1014–1024); Aleppo (1024–1080)
- Common languages: Arabic
- Religion: Shia Islam
- Government: Emirate
- Emir
  - 1014–1029: Salih ibn Mirdas
  - 1029–1038: Shibl al-Dawla Nasr
  - 1042–1062: Mu'izz al-Dawla Thimal
- History
  - Established: 1014
  - Disestablished: 1080
- Currency: Dirham, dinar
Preceded by	Succeeded by
Hamdanid dynasty; Fatimid Caliphate	Uqaylid dynasty
- Today part of: Syria; Lebanon

The Mirdasid dynasty (Arabic: المرداسيون, romanized: al-Mirdāsiyyīn), also called the Banu Mirdas, was an Arab Shia Muslim dynasty which ruled an Aleppo-based emirate in northern Syria and the western Jazira (Upper Mesopotamia) more or less continuously from 1014 until 1080.

== History ==
=== Dominance of the Kilab in northern Syria ===
The Mirdasids were a family of the Bedouin (nomadic Arab) tribe of Banu Kilab. The Kilab's ancestral home was in central Arabia and its tribesmen first established themselves in northern Syria and the western Jazira (Upper Mesopotamia) in the years after the 630s–Muslim conquest. A second major wave of Kilabi tribesmen migrated to northern Syria from Arabia in the 9th century. The political vacuum and frequent revolts throughout the region during that period paved the way for the Kilab to strengthen their influence, becoming the predominant tribe in the region north of the Palmyrene steppe and west of the Euphrates River by the early to mid-10th century.

A third major wave of Kilabi migrants, principally from the Abu Bakr branch of the tribe from which the Mirdasids sprung, had invaded northern Syria in 932. This Kilabi migration was encouraged or directly supported by the Qarmatian movement, a radical millennarian Shi'a Isma'ili sect that had spread from southern Iraq in the second half of the 9th century. Around this time, the Bedouin tribes of Syria and Mesopotamia experienced marked population growth, which coincided with rising grain prices. This, according to historian Thierry Bianquis, made the tribes "susceptible to Qarmatian [sic] propaganda denouncing the wealth of the urban Sunni population". The Kilab and other branches of the Banu Amir, such as the Uqayl, Qushayr and Numayr, provided the bulk of the Qarmatians' military personnel. The Qarmatian campaigns "led to fundamental changes in the distribution and relative strengths of the bedouin tribes in the Syrian and Arabian deserts", and was the most important such realignment of the Arab tribes until the 18th century.

The dominance of the Kilab prevented Muhammad ibn Tughj al-Ikhshid (r. 935–946), the ruler of Egypt and southern Syria, from exercising power in northern Syria, which he had conquered in the late 930s. He allied with part of the tribe, appointing one of its chiefs, Ahmad ibn Sa'id, as governor of Aleppo in 939. In the months after, al-Ikhshid's forces were driven out of northern Syria by the Abbasids. Between 941 and 944, the political situation there was fluid and at one point, al-Ikhshid reoccupied the region. He appointed Ahmad ibn Sa'id as governor of Antioch and the latter's brother, Uthman, as governor of Aleppo. Their appointments aroused the jealousy of other Kilabi chiefs. Seeking to replace their kinsmen, they invited the Hamdanids of Mosul to invade Aleppo with their assistance. The 13th-century historian Ibn al-Adim asserts that the internal divisions among the Kilab enabled the Hamdanid Sayf al-Dawla to establish his emirate in Aleppo. Due to incessant Bedouin raids against his subjects, Sayf al-Dawla expelled most of the tribes of northern Syria to the Jazira, except for the Kilab, which was the only Bedouin tribe authorized to inhabit the area.

Throughout the 10th and 11th centuries, the Kilab "represented an organised military force with powerful cavalry trained in mounted swordsmanship and not fearing to confront a government army on the field of battle", according to Bianquis. Salibi notes that the northern Syrian Kilab's main military assets were its "Bedouin swiftness of movement" and its reservoir of tribal kin in the Jazira. The Kilab "served those who paid most and often, at a time of crisis, would sell their employer to the highest bidder", according to the historian Suhayl Zakkar. Kilabi tribes were involved in every Hamdanid struggle with the Byzantine Empire, which ruled the regions north of Syria, every uprising against the Hamdanids, and in intra-dynastic conflicts over the emirate of Aleppo. Between 1009 and 1012, the Kilab participated in the struggle for control of Aleppo between the emirate's ruler, Mansur ibn Lu'lu', and its former rulers, the Hamdanids, and their regional backers. Twice the Kilab betrayed the Hamdanids and their allies, and in return, demanded from Mansur numerous villages to supply them with grain, pastures to breed their flocks, and war horses. Instead, Mansur, who viewed the Kilab as a hindrance to his rule, strove to eliminate them by luring the tribesmen into a trap. To that end, in May 1012, he invited them to a feast, where his ghilmān (slave soldiers or pages; sing. ghulām) assaulted them. Several were killed and the rest were imprisoned in the citadel of Aleppo.

=== Rise of the Mirdasid emirate ===
Among the Kilabi chiefs jailed by Mansur was Salih ibn Mirdas, the founder of the Mirdasid dynasty, whose family was based in the area of Qinnasrin. Salih had captured the fortress town of al-Rahba, situated along the Euphrates River, at the strategic crossroads between Iraq and Syria, in 1008, boosting his prestige among the Kilab and probably encouraging his wider territorial ambitions. Salih escaped imprisonment in 1014 and gained the allegiance of his tribesmen in Marj Dabiq, in the environs of Aleppo. Under his leadership, they defeated and captured Mansur, extricating major concessions in the subsequent negotiations to release him. These included the allotment of half of the Aleppo emirate's revenues to the Kilab and recognition of Salih as the paramount emir of the Kilab with formal authority over his tribesmen. In the following years, Salih consolidated his authority over the Kilab and expanded his emirate to include the important Euphrates fortress towns of Manbij and Balis.

The Egypt-based Fatimid Caliphate eventually gained authority over Aleppo, appointing Aziz al-Dawla as its governor there in 1017. Salih maintained friendly relations with him, while he strengthened his Jaziran emirate, which was centered in al-Rahba, where he formed an administration and presided over a tribal court. By 1022, he expanded this realm to include the twin Euphrates cities of Raqqa and al-Rafiqa. Aziz al-Dawla was killed that year and a period of chaos followed, but the Fatimids held onto the city. In 1023, Salih inaugurated an unprecedented military alliance of the Kilab and the two other strongest Arab tribes in Syria, the Banu Kalb of the Damascus region and the Jarrahid-led Banu Tayy of Transjordan, whereby the three tribes agreed to support the other in taking over Aleppo, Damascus, and Palestine, respectively, from the Fatimids. After backing the Tayy and Kalb in these efforts, Salih moved on Aleppo, capturing the town of Ma'arrat Misrin in its countryside from the Fatimids.

In late 1024, Salih's forces besieged Aleppo, capturing the city and its citadel from the Fatimids in early 1025, bringing "to success the plan which guided [Salih's Kilabi] forebears for a century", in the words of Bianquis. By then, he had also captured a string of central Syrian towns and fortresses, including Sidon on the Mediterranean, Baalbek and Homs, affording his new, Aleppo-based emirate an outlet to the sea and control of the trade route to Damascus. Despite his conflict with the Fatimids, he gave formal allegiance to the Fatimid caliph al-Zahir (r. 1021–1036), who, in turn, recognized him as emir of Aleppo. After Salih's Arab tribal alliance frayed with the defection of the Banu Kalb to the Fatimids in 1028, the Fatimid general Anushtakin al-Dizbari launched an assault against the Tayy in Palestine. Salih came to his ally's backing, but was slain in the Battle of al-Uqhuwana in 1029. This was soon after followed by the Fatimids resuming control over Salih's central Syrian domains.

=== Reigns of Nasr and Thimal ===
Salih was succeeded by his sons Shibl al-Dawla Nasr and Mu'izz al-Dawla Thimal, who concentrated their forces in northern Syria and the western Jazira after the Fatimid offensive. Not long after their succession, they faced an offensive from the Byzantine Empire, which controlled Antioch and the Anatolia region north of their domains. A diplomatic appeal to the Byzantine emperor Romanos III by their cousin Muqallid ibn Kamil ibn Mirdas was rejected and the emperor led the assault on the young Mirdasid emirs in person, in the summer of 1030. While Thimal strategically withdrew with the bulk of the Mirdasids' forces from Aleppo, Nasr and his Bedouin warriors from the Kilab and Numayr confronted Romanos and routed his forces at the Battle of Azaz. In the aftermath, Nasr became the sole Mirdasid ruler of Aleppo with the backing of the Byzantines, while Thimal's power was centered in al-Rahba, where most of the Kilab supported him.

Nasr's rule came to an end in 1038, when he was killed in battle confronting an offensive led by Anushtakin, who had objected to Nasr's allotment of Homs by the Fatimid government in Cairo. Thimal briefly took control of Aleppo, but soon after withdrew to al-Rahba, while Anushtakin followed up by seizing control of Aleppo from Thimal's deputies there, his cousin Muqallid and Khalifa ibn Jabir al-Kilabi, in the summer of 1038. Thimal further lost Balis and Manbij to Anushtakin, but retained control of al-Rahba. The Mirdasids had also since lost control of Raqqa and al-Rafiqa to the Numayrids, but Thimal married the Numayrid princess, al-Sayyida al-Alawiyya, and practically inherited control of the twin cities after the death of their ruler, al-Sayyida's brother Shabib ibn Waththab, in 1039 or 1040. He subsequently made Raqqa his capital to position himself closer to Aleppo. In late 1041, the Fatimid government appointed Thimal governor of Aleppo, but Anushtakin refused to vacate. He died of natural causes in 1042, but Thimal still had to seize the city by force from Anushtakin's forces, which he captured by the end of the year.

While initially remaining on good terms with the Fatimid caliph al-Mustansir (r. , Thimal also requested Byzantine protection, and became a vassal of the empire. He successfully fought off two imperial Fatimid campaigns between 1048 and 1050, the first led by a scion of the Hamdanids, Nasir al-Dawla ibn Hamdan, and the second by the eunuch Rifq. Peace was subsequently reached between Thimal and the caliph, largely a result of a successful diplomatic mission to Cairo led by al-Sayyida al-Alawiyya. The following seven years were marked by stability and prosperity and Aleppo experienced a major construction boom during this period. Nevertheless, Thimal vacated his seat in Aleppo due to an inability to satiate the financial demands of his Kilabi tribal base and the growing conflict with his Balis-based brother, Atiyya, who was backed by a good part of their tribe. The Fatimids installed their own governor, Ibn Mulhim, while compensating Thimal with holdings along the central Syrian coast. When Thimal's nephew, Nasr's son Rashid al-Dawla Mahmud, captured Aleppo in 1060, the Fatimids stripped Thimal of his coastal possessions, prompting Thimal to return to Aleppo. He was unable to oust Mahmud by force, but the Kilabi chiefs brokered a settlement, giving Thimal control of Aleppo in 1061, in return for financial concessions.

=== Decline and fall ===
After Thimal's death a succession dispute emerged between Mahmud and Thimal's brother Atiyya, leading to a split in the Mirdasid domains. Mahmud controlled the western half, while Atiyya controlled the east. In order to gain an edge over Mahmud, Atiyya recruited a band of Turks, but they later defected to Mahmud, forcing Atiyya to give up Aleppo in 1065.

The Turks began moving into northern Syria in greater numbers, forcing Mahmud to convert to Sunni Islam and become a vassal of the Seljuk sultan. Mahmud's death in 1075, followed by that of his son and successor Nasr ibn Mahmud in 1076, resulted in Nasr's brother Sabiq ibn Mahmud becoming amir. Conflicts between him and members of his family, along with several different Turkish groups, left the Mirdasid domains devastated, and in 1080, prompted by Sabiq, the Uqaylid emir of Mosul, Sharaf al-Dawla Muslim, took over Aleppo. The Mirdasids maintained a level of influence in the region after the loss of Aleppo, and attempted to stem the advance of the First Crusade.

== List of Mirdasid emirs ==
Royal title	Name	Reign start	Reign end	Notes
Asad al-Dawla	Salih ibn Mirdas	18 January 1025	12 May 1029	He had become the paramount emir of Banu Kilab by 1014.
Shibl al-Dawla	Nasr ibn Salih	May 1029	May 1038
Mu'izz al-Dawla	Thimal ibn Salih	February 1042	1057
Rashid al-Dawla	Mahmud ibn Nasr	July/August 1060	April 1061	Son of Nasr and the Numayrid princess al-Sayyida Alawiyya bint Waththab.
Mu'izz al-Dawla	Thimal ibn Salih	April 1061	1062
Asad al-Dawla	Atiyya ibn Salih	1062	August 1065	Son of Salih and Tarud; Ruled Aleppo and the eastern part of the Mirdasid emirate extending from al-Rahba in the east to the north–south Azaz–Qinnasrin line in the west.
Rashid al-Dawla	Mahmud ibn Nasr	August 1065	1074/75	Ruled the western part of the Mirdasid emirate until defeating Atiyya in 1065.; The emirate lost al-Rahba in 1068 and Manbij in 1069/70, but Mahmud regained the former in 1072/73.
Jalal al-Dawla	Nasr ibn Mahmud	1074/75	1075	Eldest son of Mahmud.; Emirate regained Manbij in October 1075.
	Sabiq ibn Mahmud	1075/1076	June 1080	Son of Mahmud.; Surrendered Aleppo to the Uqaylid ruler Sharaf al-Dawla Muslim and given a fief in the vicinity of al-Rahba.; Last Mirdasid emir of Aleppo.

== Family tree ==
The Mirdasid dynasty

Mirdas	Rabab al-Zawqaliyya
Salih (Asad al-Dawla) (r. 1025–1029)	Tarud	Kamil
Nasr (Shibl al-Dawla) (r. 1029–1038)	Sayyida al-Alawiyya	Thimal (Mu'izz al-Dawla) (r. 1042–1058, r. 1061–1062)	Atiyya (Asad al-Dawla) (r. 1062–1065)	Muqallid	Ja'far
Daughter of Jalal al-Dawla	Mahmud (Rashid al-Dawla) (r. 1060–1061, r. 1065–1075)	Waththab	Thabit	Mani
Nasr (r. 1075–1076)	Sabiq (r. 1076–1080)	Shabib	Waththab	Mani'a	Muslim (Sharaf al-Dawla) (r. 1080–1086)

Emir of Aleppo
Italicized indicates female

== Kurdish offshoot ==
According to the Sharafnama, the Kurdish Mirdasi dynasty, ruling Eğil, Palu and Çermik, took its name from the Mirdasids. Part of the Mirdasids had fled to this region after Salih ibn Mirdas had been killed in 1029. The ruling dynasty allegedly commenced in the early 11th century, when a mystic by the name of Pir Mansour travelled from Hakkari to the village of Pîran, close to the fortress of Egil. He attained widespread fame among the local Kurds and Mirdasids, and his son Pir Bedir took the fortress of Egil by force and initiated the dynasty's rule over the region.

== See also ==
- List of Shi'a Muslims dynasties

== Sources ==
- Amabe, Fukuzo (2016). Urban Autonomy in Medieval Islam: Damascus, Aleppo, Cordoba, Toledo, Valencia and Tunis. Leiden: Brill. ISBN 978-90-04-31598-3.
- Bianquis, Thierry (1993). "Mirdās, Banū or Mirdāsids". In Bosworth, C. E.; van Donzel, E.; Heinrichs, W. P. & Pellat, Ch. (eds.). The Encyclopaedia of Islam, Second Edition. Volume VII: Mif–Naz. Leiden: E. J. Brill. pp. 115–123. doi:10.1163/1573-3912_islam_SIM_5220. ISBN 978-90-04-09419-2.
- Daftary, Farhad (2007). The Ismāʿı̄lı̄s: Their History and Doctrines (Second ed.). Cambridge: Cambridge University Press. ISBN 978-0-521-61636-2.
- Kennedy, Hugh (2004) [1986]. The Prophet and the Age of the Caliphates: The Islamic Near East from the 6th to the 11th Century (Second ed.). Harlow: Longman. ISBN 978-0-582-40525-7.
- Salibi, Kamal S. (1977). Syria Under Islam: Empire on Trial, 634–1097, Volume 1. Delmar: Caravan Books. ISBN 978-0882060132.
- Zakkar, Suhayl (1971). The Emirate of Aleppo: 1004–1094. Beirut: Dar al-Amanah. OCLC 759803726.
