= Abu Muhammad al-Yazuri =

Vizier of the Fatimid Caliphate from 1050 to 1058

Abu Muhammad al-Yazuri was from the small town of Yazur, east of Jaffa in Palestine, and was a Palestinian Hanafi Sunni Muslim known as a man of the pen. He was a vizier of the Fatimid Caliphate, holding office from 1050 to 1058. He died in 1058.

== Biography ==
Al-Yazuri was born in Yazur, where he later worked as a judge before traveling to Ramla. When confronted by the governor of Ramla, al-Yazuri fled to Cairo and entered service as a eunuch servant to Rasad, the mother of al-Mustansir Billah.

In 1050, relations between the Fatimids and the Zirid dynasty were strained after the Zirids adopted Sunni Islam and subsequently recognized the Abbasid caliph. The Fatimid caliph al-Mustansir acted on al-Yazuri's advice and allocated the Maghreb to the Banu Hilal and Banu Sulaym.

In 1052, Al-Mu'izz ibn Badis, ruler of the Zirids, placed his own name before that of the caliph in an official letter. He also approached the Arab tribes Banu Riyah and Banu Zughba, who were plundering Egypt, and sought alliances with the tribes of Ifriqiya, as well as the Banu Sulaym of Cyrenaica. The wazir al-Yazuri then sent the Banu Hilal to Ifriqiya to punish al-Mu'izz for reportedly addressing him in the mukātaba with the honorific ṣanīʿa instead of ʿAbd Amīr al-Muʾminīn, and convinced them to besiege him in Qayrawan. According to Ibn Khaldun, al-Yazuri released Arab tribesmen into Tunisia.

The Byzantine Empire and the Fatimids were at peace for some time and had agreed to provide aid to one another in the event of famine due to wheat shortages. In 1055, the Fatimid exile al-Mu'ayyad fi'l-Din Abu Nasr Hibat Allah intercepted Byzantine reports that the Seljuk sultan Tughril had made a pact with the Byzantines against the Fatimids. He then came into contact with Turkish forces, who promised to assist in a Fatimid conquest of Baghdad. Shortly thereafter, al-Mu'ayyad was sent to Iraq as part of a Fatimid delegation, and the caliph agreed to send troops against Tughril to prevent his conquest of Syria and Egypt.

In Dhu al-Hijjah (29 January–26 February 1058), al-Yazuri was arrested in Egypt, and large sums of money were demanded from him and his associates; his correspondence with the Seljuks in Baghdad was also discovered.

In 1058, al-Yazuri was accused of corresponding with Tughril and supporting Fatimid rivals and enemies of the state. He was taken to Tinnis, where he was executed. Upon his death, he was effectively the last civil vizier (vizier of the pen), as he was succeeded by several weak viziers, which deepened factional rivalries in the army.

Preceded by Abu'l-Fadl Sa'id ibn Masud	Vizier of the Fatimid Caliphate; 1050–1058	Succeeded by Abu'l-Faraj Abdallah ibn Muhammad al-Babili
