= Thierry Bianquis =

French Orientalist and Arabist (1935–2014)

Thierry Bianquis (3 August 1935 – 2 September 2014) was a French Orientalist and Arabist. His main interest was the medieval Islamic Middle East, most notably the Fatimid era of Egypt and Syria, which was the subject of his dissertation.

Born in Broummana, Lebanon, in 1935, he spent his childhood in the country before coming to France for his higher education. He was a resident of the Institut Français d'Etudes Arabes de Damas at Damascus in 1967–1975, and served as its director in 1975–1981, as well as a member of the Institut Français d'Archéologie Orientale at Cairo in 1971–1975. In 1991, he was elected professor of Islamic history and civilisation at Université Lumière Lyon 2. Alongside his own voluminous publications, he served as an editor of the second edition of the Encyclopaedia of Islam, and was one of the main authors of The Cambridge history of Egypt: Islamic Egypt (641-1517).

== Sources ==
- Guichard, Pierre (2016). "In memoriam Thierry Bianquis (1935-2014)". Arabica. 63 (6): 575–578. doi:10.1163/15700585-12341427. ISSN 0570-5398.
- Tillier, Mathieu; Zouache, Abbès (2015). "Thierry Bianquis (1935‑2014)". Bulletin d'Études Orientales (in French). LXIII (63): 7–18. doi:10.4000/beo.2597.
