= Sabiq ibn Mahmud =

Emir of Aleppo
- Reign: 1076–1080
- Predecessor: Nasr ibn Mahmud
- Successor: Sharaf al-Dawla
Names
- Sābiq Abūʾl-Faḍāʾil ibn Mahmūd
- Tribe: Banu Kilab
- Dynasty: Mirdasid
- Father: Mahmud ibn Nasr

Abūʾl-Faḍāʾil Sābiq ibn Mahmūd (Arabic: سابق أبوالفضائل بن محمود) was the Mirdasid emir of Aleppo from 1076 to 1080.

== Rule ==
Following the death of Sabiq's older brother, the emir of Aleppo Nasr, the latter's influential adviser Sadid al-Mulk Ali of the Banu Munqidh, arranged for Sabiq to be installed as his successor. Sabiq, who lived in Aleppo city, had to be hoisted over the walls of Aleppo's citadel by a rope to assume the emirate as he had been drunkenly immobile at the time. Sabiq's laqab (regnal title) was Izz al-Mulk, Abu'l-Fada'il (Glory of the Kingship, Father of Merits). According to the historian Mariam Yared-Riachi, contrary to his title, Sabiq was considered by the 13th-century Aleppine chronicler Ibn al-Adim as one of the most backward Mirdasid emirs.

At the start of his rule Sabiq released the chief of Aleppo's Turkmen mercenaries, Ahmad Shah, who had been imprisoned by Nasr for unknown reasons. Ahmad Shah's Turkmens had killed Nasr when they were attacked by him in their base at al-Hadir in Aleppo's southern outskirts. After freeing Ahmad Shah, Sabiq gave him a gift of 1,000 dinars and a promise of a monthly allowance of 30 dinars. Upon Sabiq's instruction, Ahmad Shah reassured his Turkmen followers of the Mirdasid emir's goodwill, pacifying them.

=== Civil war ===
Ibn al-Adim considered Sabiq an ineffective emir and a puppet of Ahmad Shah. The Turkmens' monopolization of power in the emirate under Sabiq riled the Mirdasids' tribe, the Banu Kilab, which nominated Sabiq's brother Waththab as their emir in opposition and helped drive out Sadid al-Mulk from Aleppo. Sabiq's other brother Shabib lent Waththab his support, as did their Kilabi cousin Mubarak ibn Shibl. The Kilab mobilized its horsemen and foot soldiers, numbering 70,000-strong according to Ibn al-Adim, in the plain of Qinnasrin, in preparation for an assault on Aleppo. A verse by the contemporary local poet Ibn Hayyus indicates Sabiq was pressured by his advisers not to fight his tribe and seek conciliation instead. Meanwhile, Ahmad Shah had recruited the Turkmen chief Muhammad ibn Dimlaj and his 500 horsemen in June 1076. On 7 July the Turkmens ambushed and dispersed the Kilab. They captured from the Kilab 100,000 camels, 400,000 sheep, 10,000 military slaves and several Kilabi wives and concubines, according to the sources. Ahmad Shah transported the captured prisoners and booty to Sabiq, who ordered the prisoners' release. One of the Kilabi captives was Sabiq's sister, the wife of Mubarak ibn Shibl, whom he subsequently ordered to live with him instead.

On 20 July, Ibn Dimlaj lured Ahmad Shah to a victory banquet and arrested him. In the assessment of the historian Suheil Zakkar, Sabiq could have used the opportunity to incite Ahmad Shah's troops against Ibn Dimlaj to sap the Turkmens' strength. Instead, Sabiq paid Ibn Dimlaj a ransom of 10,000 or 100,000 dinars and twenty horses to release Ahmad Shah. Waththab, Mubarak ibn Shibl and another Kilabi rebel chief, Hamid ibn Zughayb, left to Khurasan in the summer of 1077 seeking assistance against Sabiq from the Seljuk sultan Malik-Shah I. The sultan granted each of the Kilabi chiefs an iqta in northern Syria and appointed his brother Tutush to take over Syria as governor. Tutush launched the campaign, joined by the Kilabi rebels, several bands of Turkmens, including that of Ibn Dimlaj, and the Uqaylid emir of Mosul, Muslim ibn Quraysh.

Sabiq recalled Ahmad Shah from his siege against Byzantine-held Antioch, where he had driven the population to near starvation, to confront Tutush's incoming army. The latter reached Aleppo in late 1077 and began a three-month-long siege of the city. Sabiq authorized the Turkmens of al-Hadir to escort their families to safety to the Munqidh-held Hisn al-Jisr fortress on the Orontes River, though their families later died there from disease. Ahmad Shah was killed during the siege, which nonetheless remained largely ineffective due to the secret collusion between Muslim ibn Quraysh and Sabiq. Muslim was personally fond of Sabiq, opposed a Seljuk takeover of Aleppo, and admonished the Kilabi chiefs for inviting Turkish foreigners against their kinsman. With Ahmad Shah's death, Muslim was able to play an influential role with Sabiq. Moreover, he persuaded the Kilab to defect from Tutush's army and had Waththab and Shabib reconcile with and join Sabiq in Aleppo. Muslim informed Tutush that he was withdrawing from the siege, but before departing he entered Aleppo through Bab al-Iraq where he allowed his troops to sell the Aleppines food and supplies.

=== Fall ===
Tutush maintained the siege and had called for reinforcements from Malik-Shah before Muslim's withdrawal. On his way back to Mosul, Muslim encountered the 1,000 Seljuk reinforcements at Sinjar. After failing to persuade them to turn back, he sent Sabiq warnings of their presence. Sabiq then delivered a poem via his cousin Mansur ibn Kamil to the Kilabi chief Abu Za'ida Muhammad ibn Za'ida imploring his tribesmen rescue the Mirdasid emirate as the last Arab principality in Syria from the Turks. Afterward, Abu Za'ida, with Muslim's assistance, raised an army of 1,000 horsemen and 500 foot soldiers from the Arab tribes of Kilab, Numayr, Qushayr and Uqayl. The tribal coalition ambushed and routed the Seljuk reinforcements at Wadi Butnan, slaying most of them. This prompted Tutush to leave Aleppo and attack the Kilabi tribesmen who had remained in the Aleppo region, but the tribesmen evaded pursuit by retreating into the desert. Meanwhile, the Aleppines raided Tutush's camp outside the city walls, killing the guards he left behind and seizing all of its provisions. Tutush consequently withdrew to Diyar Bakr.

In 1080, Tutush influenced Sabiq to cede the emirate to the Uqaylid emir Muslim ibn Quraysh "Sharaf al-Dawla". This represented the permanent loss of Aleppo by the Mirdasids, who, despite being granted a few towns in the region as compensation for their loss, largely disappear from history after 1080.

== Bibliography ==
- Bianquis, Thierry (2012). "Mirdās, Banū or Mirdāsids". In Bosworth, C. E.; van Donzel, E.; Heinrichs, W. P. & Pellat, Ch. (eds.). The Encyclopaedia of Islam, Second Edition. Volume VII: Mif–Naz. Leiden: E. J. Brill. pp. 115–123. doi:10.1163/1573-3912_islam_SIM_5220. ISBN 978-90-04-09419-2.
- Bosworth, Clifford (2014). New Islamic Dynasties. pp. 121–123.
- Zakkar, Suheil (1969). The Emirate of Aleppo 392/1002–487/1094 (PDF) (PhD). London: University of London.

Preceded by Nasr ibn Mahmud	Emir of Aleppo; 1076–1080	Succeeded by Sharaf al-Dawla
