= Siege of Manbij (1075) =

- Part of Arab–Byzantine wars
| Date | September–October 1075 |
| Location | Manbij, northern Syria |
| Result | Mirdasid victory |

Belligerents
| Mirdasid dynasty Turkmens | Byzantine Empire |

Commanders and leaders
| Nasr ibn Mahmud; Ahmed Shah Turkmani; Sabiq ibn Mahmud (Uncertain) | Unknown |

The Siege of Manbij in 1075 was one of the most prominent sieges of the Mirdasid dynasty, and a major battle for the ruling dynasty in the Arab-Byzantine wars.

== Background ==
Manbij had been under Byzantine Empire control since its capture in 1068, standing as one of the empire's last major strongholds in the region.

== Siege ==
In 1075, the Mirdasid emir Nasr ibn Mahmud assembled his troops and campaigned against Manbij, supported by Turkmen commander Ahmad Shah. Other sources claim this campaign was attributed to Nasr’s brother and successor, Sabiq ibn Mahmud, who also enjoyed the support of Turkmen Ahmad Shah. The Mirdasid and Turkmen forces left for Manbij but found the town in Byzantine Empire hands, i.e. currently it was being ruled by Byzantines. Upon arrival, they thus laid a close and long siege of Manbij. Byzantines in the garrison suffered heavy casualties during the lengthy siege. Also, the Byzantine governor began to lose hope of relief. After realizing there would be no reinforcement, the governor surrendered in Manbij. As a result, the Mirdasid September-October 1075 troops took control of Manbij. The ancient sources do not provide any information about the Byzantine general, size of the troops.

== Aftermath ==
The fall of Manbij had significant strategic implications for the Byzantine presence in the Levant and Anatolia. Its capture severed the geographical and military lines of communication between Antioch and Edessa, further isolating Byzantine Antioch.
