= Banu Kilab =

Arab tribe

- Qaysi Arab tribe
- Nisba: Kilābī
- Location: 6th century CE–9th century: Central Arabia; 7th century–13th century: Northern Syria
- Descended from: Kilab ibn Rabi'a ibn Amir ibn Sa'sa
- Parent tribe: Banu Amir
- Branches: Abd Allah; Abu Bakr; Qurata; Mirdasid dynasty; Al-Adbat; Amr; Banu Zufar; Amir; Wahid; Ja'far; Ka'b; Mu'awiya al-Dibab; Banu Bayhas; Rabi'a; Ru'as
- Religion: Polytheism (pre-630); Islam (post 630); Shia Islam (10th-11th centuries)

The Banu Kilab (Arabic: بنو كِلاب, romanized: Banū Kilāb) was an Arab tribe in the western Najd (central Arabia) where they controlled the horse-breeding pastures of Dariyya from the mid-6th century until at least the mid-9th century. The tribe was divided into ten branches, the most prominent being the Ja'far, Abu Bakr, Amr, Dibab and Abd Allah. The Ja'far led the Kilab and its parent tribe of Banu Amir, and, at times, the larger Hawazin tribal confederation from the time of the Kilab's entry into the historical record, c. 550, until the advent of Islam, c. 630, except for two occasions when the larger Abu Bakr was at the helm. Under the Ja'far's leadership the Kilab defeated rival tribes and the Lakhmid kings and eventually became guards of the Lakhmid caravans to the annual fair in the Hejaz (western Arabia). The killing of a Ja'far chief as he escorted one such caravan led to the Fijar War between the Hawazin and the Quraysh of Mecca.

The Kilab, or at least its chief, Amir ibn al-Tufayl, was involved in the massacre of Muslims at Bir Ma'una in 626 despite being under the protection of Amir's uncle Abu Bara. Amir's successor converted to Islam, followed by other tribesmen, including the prominent poet Labid and al-Dahhak ibn Sufyan, who was dispatched by the Islamic prophet Muhammad on an expedition against a recalcitrant Kilabi clan. The Banu Amir played a minor role in the early Muslim conquests, but members of the Kilab later established themselves in the garrison towns of Iraq. Several, including Aslam ibn Zur'a and his family, were governors of Basra, Khurasan, and other eastern provinces under the Umayyad caliphs in 661–750.

The Kilabi chief Zufar ibn al-Harith led the rebel Qays nomads of the Jazira (Upper Mesopotamia) and Jund Qinnasrin (northern Syria). He obtained from the Umayyads privileges later inherited by his family, who were generally recognized as the preeminent leaders of the Qays. Zufar's grandson, Abu al-Ward, led an abortive Qaysi revolt against the Umayyads' Abbasid successors in 750. In 813 a Kilabi chief of the Qays in Damascus, Ibn Bayhas, crushed an Umayyad revolt against the Abbasids, after which he ruled Damascus for ten years. There were two more mass migrations of Kilabi tribesmen from Arabia to northern Syria in the 9th and 10th centuries, the last associated with the rebellious Qarmatian movement. Through their numerical strength, skilled swordsmanship, and Bedouin mobility, the Kilab became the dominant military force in northern Syria. Two Kilabi brothers were appointed governors of Aleppo under the Ikshidids of Egypt in 939 and the 940s, until they handed over power under pressure from rival Kilabi chiefs to the Hamdanid emir Sayf al-Dawla in 944. The Kilab often rebelled against the Hamdanids and participated in their intra-dynastic disputes.

In the early 11th century, Salih ibn Mirdas assumed leadership of the Kilab and by 1025, he established an Aleppo-based emirate (principality) that spanned much of the western Jazira and northern Syria. His Mirdasid dynasty ruled Aleppo until 1080, with minor interruption. The Kilab were the core of the Mirdasid army and defended their realm, defeating the Byzantine emperor Romanos III at the Battle of Azaz in 1030 and fending off several Fatimid assaults in later years. Recurring internal divisions had sapped the tribe's strength by the reign of the last Mirdasid emir. The Kilab retained scattered fortresses and remained a major source of military recruitment for the Mirdasids' successors, but they lost their paramountcy to Turkmen groups which had begun entering northern Syria in significant numbers from the late 11th century. The Ayyubids confiscated the Kilab's last holdings in the region and put the tribe under the authority of an amir al-arab (state-sponsored commander of the Bedouin), an office held by the Al Fadl house of the rival Banu Tayy. Part of the Kilab migrated to Anatolia, reappearing in 1262 as auxiliaries of the Armenians in a raid against the Mamluks. In 1277 the tribe submitted to the Mamluk sultan Baybars in northern Syria.

The Kilabi way of life in Syria resembled their pre-Islamic existence in Arabia. There were raids and counter-raids against neighboring tribes and between the tribe itself, characterized by individual duels and boasts of valor, and motivated by booty or revenge. Young tribesmen spent the springtime horse-racing and wine-drinking. Mass banquets were held for special occasions, such as weddings and circumcisions. The women of the Kilab in Syria generally enjoyed equality with the men of the tribe and a number of Kilabi women played prominent roles in Mirdasid politics. The Kilab in Syria were Twelver Shia Muslims, though the extent of their adherence to the faith was unclear.

== Arabia ==
=== Origins and branches ===
The Banu Kilab were a major branch of the Banu Amir ibn Sa'sa'a, a large Bedouin (nomadic Arab) tribe, which first appeared in the historical record in the mid-6th century; they were mentioned in a South Arabian inscription by Abraha in 544/45 or 547. The Banu Amir were the most powerful tribe of the Hawazin confederation. (Note: References to the Hawazin in the sources usually referred to the Banu Jusham, Banu Nasr and Banu Sa'd, while the Banu Amir and Thaqif were typically mentioned separately.) According to the Arab genealogical tradition, the Kilab's eponymous progenitor was a son of Rabi'a ibn Amir ibn Sa'sa'a and the latter's wife Majd, the daughter of Taym ibn Murra of the Quraysh, the mercantile tribe in control of the Ka'aba, a major sanctuary in Mecca for the polytheistic Arab tribes in the pre-Islamic period. The marriage of Rabi'a and Majd spawned another prominent branch of the Banu Amir, the Banu Ka'b.

There were ten first-tier divisions of the Kilab, each named after a son of the tribe's founder. They were the Ja'far, Abu Bakr, Amr, Amir, Mu'awiya, Abd Allah al-Samut, al-Adbat, Ka'b, Rabi'a, and Ru'as, the most prominent being the first five. The Abu Bakr was the largest and strongest division, followed by the Amr. The Amir division's Wahid clan was more numerous than the Amr, but weaker. The Abu Bakr, Amr, and Wahid shared the same maternal ancestor, Subay'a bint Murra ibn Sa'sa'a. The Amr and Wahid were traditionally close allies of the tribe's preeminent house, the Ja'far. The Mu'awiya was commonly known as al-Dibab (lit. 'the lizards'), because five of its progenitor's sons, Dabb, Dabab, Mudibb, Hisl, and Husayl, bore different names for a lizard. About half of the Mu'awiya lived a settled life, while the other half remained nomadic, like the rest of the Kilab. The Rabi'a, Ru'as, Ka'b, and al-Adbat were the least prominent divisions. The Abd Allah al-Samut grew prominent only with the advent of Islam. Each of the main divisions of the Kilab were composed of several branches and sub-tribes.

An abbreviated tree showing the branches of the Banu Kilab and the main branches of the Kilab's parent tribes, the Banu Amir, Hawazin and Qays

Qays
Hawazin	Ghatafan	Ghani	Sulaym	Muharib
Amir	Nasr	Jusham	Sa'd	Thaqif
Kilab	Ka'b	Hilal	Numayr
Ja'far	Abu Bakr	Amr	Al-Samut	Amir	Al-Dibab	Ru'as	Al-Adbat	Ka'b	Rabi'a
Ka'b	Abd Allah	Abd	Wahid

=== Abode ===
Approximate locations of some of the important tribes of the Arabian Peninsula in the late 6th century. The Banu Kilab are denoted in the western, middle area of the peninsula.

The Banu Amir's original homeland was the area west of the Turubah oasis, extending eastward beyond Ranyah to the uplands south of the modern Mecca–Riyadh highway in Najd (central Arabia). From this region, the Kilab migrated northward and northwestward into a large area which later became known as the Hima Dariyya. (Note: A hima (pl. ahma; protected or forbidden place) was an area with some vegetation in the desert reserved for the breeding of Arabian horses, that, unlike camels, required water and herbaceous vegetation daily. A hima was controlled by a certain tribe and access to it was restricted to members of the tribe. The ahma first emerged in Najd in the 5th or 6th centuries, and the best known hima was the Hima Dariyya, according to the historian Irfan Shahid.) At one point in the pre-Islamic period, the Kilab controlled nine-tenths of the Hima. They also occupied the area south of the Hima as far west as al-Siyy (about 200 kilometers (120 mi) east of Mecca). The previously established tribes of the Dariyya area, the Numayr (which was later counted as a subtribe of the Banu Amir), part of the Muharib, and the Ghani largely became dependents of the Kilab.

The Dibab division seasonally migrated between their older settlements in the Turubah oasis and the center of the Dariyya. The Abd Allah lived along the modern Irq al-Subay', northwest of modern Riyadh, while the Abu Bakr seasonally migrated from the southern Dariyya southeastward to Karish on the modern Mecca–Riyadh highway. The Amr seasonally migrated from the southeastern Dariyya to Damkh. The Kilab's brother tribe of Ka'b and its sub-tribes of Uqayl, Qushayr, Ja'da, Harish, and Ajlan inhabited the wide stretch of territory from Ranyah and the northern approaches of Najran in the southwest to the Tuwaiq oases to the northeast. The migration areas of the Kilab and the Ka'b bordered each other along an extensive stretch. This "explains the remarkable solidarity of the Ka'b and the Kilab", according to the historian Werner Caskel.

Kilabi territory was bordered to the east by the Tamim and Ribab tribes, to the northeast by the Banu Asad, to the north and northwest by the tribes of the Ghatafan, and to the southwest by the Sulaym and the other groups of the Hawazin. To the south the Banu Amir's territories were bordered by those of the Khath'am and the South Arabian tribes of Murad, Suda' and Ju'fi, which had taken up nomadism and pushed northward toward the Banu Amir's territories. Other than the Sulaym and Hawazin, with whom the Kilab had cordial relations, the Kilab was in a constant state of latent hostilities with its neighboring tribes and with the South Arabian neighbors of the Ka'b and the Banu Amir in general. Friendly relations had been maintained with the Balharith, Nahd and Jarm of Najran to the southwest, but toward the end of the 6th century or the beginning of the 7th century the sources report hostilities between the Kilab and the Balharith.

=== Leadership of the Ja'far ===
Between 550 and 630, the Ja'far exceeded all other divisions of the Kilab, and the Banu Amir in general, in military prowess and energy. They were the leading house of the Banu Amir for most of this period, exercising "some vague authority over the Kilab", in the words of Caskel. Before the mid-6th century, the tribes of central northern Arabia, generally grouped together under the Qays confederacy, had been under the sway of the Kindite kings. As Kindite dominance faded around the mid-6th century, the Qays came under the supremacy of Zuhayr ibn Jadhima of the Banu Abs, who had the support of the Lakhmid kings of al-Hira in Iraq. The Abs were a clan of the Ghatafan, which, together with the Hawazin, accounted for most of the Qays. Zuhayr's rule was considered oppressive by the Hawazin, moving Khalid ibn Ja'far, a son of the Ja'far's eponymous progenitor, to assassinate Zuhayr. Khalid thereafter became the head of the Hawazin, which separated from the Qaysi confederacy, and gained the Lakhmids' favor.

==== Conflict with the Tamim ====
At an uncertain point after the Hawazin's break with Ghatafan, Khalid led a raid against the Banu Murra clan of Ghatafan, in which its chief was slain. In turn, the chief's son assassinated Khalid in the 560s. Khalid's killer gained protection from part of the Tamim, led by Laqit ibn Zurara, provoking the ire of the Banu Amir. Khalid's brother and successor, al-Ahwas ibn Ja'far, led an attack against the Tamim at the battle of Rahrahan and captured Laqit's brother, who soon after died in captivity. In revenge, Laqit gathered a coalition of the Tamim, the Banu Dhubyan of Ghatafan, the Asad, and contingents from the Kindite rulers of Bahrayn and the Lakhmid king al-Mundhir IV (r. 575–580). In the ensuing battle of Shi'b Jabala, the Banu Amir and Abs under al-Ahwas repulsed Laqit and achieved a decisive victory. The battle was one of the three most famous ayyam ('battle days') of the pre-Islamic Arabs, (Note: In general the ayyam battles of pre-Islamic Arabia were skirmishes ending in relatively few casualties, and whose importance were exaggerated in Arabic poetry.) and the historian Franz Krenkow called it "the most remarkable deed recorded of the Kilāb". It weakened Kindite power in northern Arabia and led to the eventual Kindite migration to the Hadramawt.

The battle took place sometime between 550 and 582. About one year after, the Banu Amir, led by the Kilabi chiefs, allied with a Kindite prince from Yemen, Hassan ibn Kabsha. Their aim was to eliminate the Darim, the branch of the Tamim that had opposed Kilab at Shi'b Jabala, and seize their lands and livestock. The Darim had prior knowledge of the planned raid and withdrew into the Wadi al-Rummah valley, placing before them another branch of the Tamim called the Yarbu. The Yarbu, an especially warlike clan, had not been present at Shi'b Jabala and thus did not incur the casualties of its Tamimi brethren. During the subsequent clash between the two sides, known as the Day of Dhu Najab, the Yarbu killed Ibn Kabsha and killed or wounded several Kilabi chiefs, including the head of the Amr division, Yazid ibn al-Sa'iq, and al-Ahwas's son and nephew.

==== Relations with the Lakhmids ====
At the beginning of the Lakhmid king al-Nu'man III's reign (r. 582–602), a delegation from the Ja'far arrived at al-Nu'man's court in al-Hira to gain favor for their tribe, at a time when the king was a friend and drinking companion of al-Rabi ibn Ziyad, a chief of the Abs and enemy of the Ja'far. The delegation was led by Abu Bara Amir ibn Malik, the nephew and successor of al-Ahwas. Al-Rabi influenced al-Nu'man against the Ja'far, prompting Abu Bara's nephew, the future celebrated poet Labid ibn Rabi'a ibn Malik, to recite his first known poem, a rajaz (prosody), in which he humiliated al-Rabi. In reaction, al-Nu'man expelled al-Rabi from his court in disgrace and granted the Ja'far unspecified requests. In the words of the historian Charles James Lyall, "the members of this illustrious family [the Ja'far] were fully conscious of its eminence". In Labid's rajaz before al-Nu'man's court he proclaimed:

We are the best of ʿĀmir son of Ṣaʿṣaʿah;
We feast our guests on platters ever full,
And smite the heads beneath the battle-din. (Note: In the translation of the literary historian Suzanne Stetkevych, the verse is:... Are cutting swords, And dishes deep and full We are the best of ʿĀmir son of Ṣaʿṣaʿah, The strikers of skulls, Right through their helmets.)

The Hawazin's relations with the Lakhmid kings were mainly predicated on transporting goods from al-Hira to the annual fair at Ukaz in the Hejaz (western Arabia), for which they were given a part of the profits. In an unspecified year before 585, the Banu Amir had attacked one of al-Nu'man's caravans on its way to Ukaz, prompting the king to dispatch a punitive expedition against the tribe. During the confrontation that followed, Abu Bara and Yazid ibn al-Sa'iq led their tribe to a decisive victory. Individual tribesmen or clans of the Hawazin at times partook in Lakhmid raids in the Najd, where the kings of al-Hira could typically not enter without escorts from the Hawazin or their allies, the Sulaym. During the early part of al-Nu'man's reign, the Qushayr clan of the Kilab's brother tribe of Ka'b, seized the king's caravan after the king had been compelled to flee from an incoming Sasanian Persian army. When another clan of the Ka'b, the Uqayl, demanded the Qushayr split the booty, fighting ensued between the two clans until a Kilabi chief, Abu Bara's brother Mu'awiya ibn Malik, arbitrated the dispute. Mu'awiya boasted of his household and its leadership position in verse:

A man am I of famous company, active in all good works, whose glory is high of head, inherited from our fathers:
... We render to the tribe all that is due and fitting: and we pardon its offenses against us, and [are admitted by all to be] its chiefs.
And when the tribe loads its burdens upon us, we stand up therewith and bear them: and when it repeats the load, we bear it yet again.

==== Fijar War ====
The ambushing and killing of the Ja'far leader Urwa al-Rahhal as he escorted the Lakhmid caravan to Ukaz sparked a series of battles between the Hawazin, under Abu Bara, and the Quraysh. This conflict took place over four years, and is known as the Fijar Wars. Urwa's killer was an ally of the Qurayshite chief Harb ibn Umayya, but the Quraysh also had close relations with the Kilab. Both tribes belonged to the Hums, a socio-economic and religious pact including a number of tribes living in the Haram (the area around Mecca considered inviolable by the Arabs). The Kilab and the Ka'b did not live within the Haram and owed their membership to their maternal Qurayshite descent. Abu Bara's and the Kilab's participation in the Fijar Wars was restricted to the first battle, in which they pursued the Quraysh from Ukaz and bested them at Nakhla, on their retreat to Mecca. When the Quraysh crossed into the Haram, the Kilab halted their pursuit in fear of violating its sanctity.

Modern historians have generally assessed that the Fijar War was related to the Quraysh's attempts to close the caravan route between al-Hira and Yemen through Ta'if, a town which commercially rivaled Mecca, or to redirect the route through Mecca. This assessment was questioned by Ella Landau-Tasseron, who posited that the Banu Amir and the Quraysh had been mutually interested in gaining greater, joint control of the annual Lakhmid caravans to Yemen. Moreover, the Ja'far and the Quraysh were both seen as enemies by the Bakr ibn Abd Manat, the branch of the Kinana to which Urwa's killer belonged. The animosity of the Bakr ibn Abd Manat toward the Ja'far stemmed from the canceling of a protection covenant by Abu Bara's brother al-Tufayl; the Bakr ibn Abd Manat had entered al-Tufayl's protection in Najd after the Quraysh had expelled them from Mecca. In the years preceding the Fijar War the Bakr ibn Abd Manat attempted to obtain commissions from the Lakhmids to guard their caravans. Although the killing of Urwa had been against the interests of the Kilab and the Quraysh, the latter were compelled to fight due to the Kilab's intent on blood revenge against the Qurayshite confederates of Urwa's killer. The Kilab's limited participation in the ensuing war may have reflected their desire not to breach the Hums pact.

==== Ja'far–Abu Bakr rivalry ====
The cohesion of the Kilab in the pre-Islamic period was particularly strong. Although its internal unity generally held in the face of external challenges, there was a recurring rivalry between the Ja'far and the Abu Bakr for leadership of the tribe. Ja'far leadership took a blow after the Kilab was routed and dispersed by the Dhubyan, as the Ja'far became isolated from its brother tribes. (Note: A drought had caused the Kilab and the Ghani, confident in their collective strength, to graze their flocks in or near the tribal territory of the Dhubyan, at a mountain called Arik, which was called "Hars" by Labid after a nearby site and the more common name for the battle that took place there between the Kilab and its neighboring rivals. During the attack, Abu Bara had the Ghani cover his tribe's retreat, but the Kilabi clans, including the Wahid and Dibab, fled in chaos. The Amr under Yazid ibn al-Sa'iq withstood the assault for several days before dispersing.) This contributed to their subsequent exile to the protection of the Balharith in Najran, which Caskel attributes to the machinations of the Abu Bakr chief, Jawwab Malik ibn Ka'b. The incident which triggered their exodus was the killing of Urwa al-Rahhal's son by a member of the Ghani, and the Ja'far's rejection of the Ghani's payment of blood money, as they regarded the Ghani to be of lesser status; in the resulting tension, the Ghani allied with the Abu Bakr.

The Banu Amir, under the leadership of the Abu Bakr, were soon after routed by an alliance of rival tribes in the battle of al-Nisar. In the subsequent peace settlement, the Banu Amir surrendered half of their property to the victors in return for their captive women. The Ja'far, under Abu Bara, were absent from the battle due to their exodus, but soon after reconciled with the Abu Bakr and their preeminent position in the tribe was restored. The Ja'far's return followed Abu Bara's rejection of a Balharith proposal for a marriage alliance, which he considered tantamount to reducing the Ja'far to a satellite clan of the Balharith. The Ja'far settled the old dispute with the Ghani when the Abu Bakr paid the blood money they owed. (Note: The dating of the Ja'far's exodus following Arik and the Banu Amir's defeat at al-Nisar is inconsistent in the sources. The historian Charles James Lyall approximated the year of al-Nisar to be about five or six years after al-Rahrahan, which he dated to 569, or "some time after Shi'b Jabala", which he dated to 570. Al-Rahrahan is generally dated one year before Shi'b Jabala. The historians C. E. Bosworth and Werner Caskel dated Shi'b Jabala to c. 580. Caskel dated the Abu Bakr's isolation of the Ja'far from the Kilab to c. 590, and held that al-Nisar was fought not long afterward.)

There may have been a second occasion in which the Ja'far left the Kilab, allied with the Balharith, and were replaced by the Abu Bakr as the tribe's leading house. On that occasion, in revenge for the death of an Abu Bakr man slain by the Asad, the Abu Bakr killed an Asad man protected by the Ja'far. Although the Abu Bakr paid the blood money, angry members of the Ja'far took captive a man of the Abu Bakr and humiliated him in captivity. The ensuing tensions between the two Kilabi houses caused the Ja'far's second exodus to Najran. The conflict was eventually settled, and the Ja'far returned to the Banu Amir. In an earlier stage of the dispute, a son of al-Ahwas appealed to the Abu Bakr in verse, offering his son Da'b as a hostage for them to humiliate:

Take Daʾb in exchange for the wrong that I have done you—you have no superiority over Daʾb:
for among those not of royal race none has superiority over us; and among your kinsmen you can find equality in bloodwite.

==== Later battles with the Ghatafan ====
In the last decade of the 6th century, the Banu Amir under Ja'far leadership launched a raid against the Murra and Fazara clans of Ghatafan in their abode in Wadi al-Raqam. The Banu Amir attempted to escape with the booty they had captured, as the Murra and Fazara horsemen pursued them. The Banu Amir's horses were slow due to exhaustion, and the Ghatafan clans had the advantage of fighting on their own terrain. The main body of the Banu Amir ended trapped between enemy tribesmen. A son of al-Tufayl and two grandsons of al-Ahwas were slain, and dozens of Banu Amir captives were executed in revenge for previous killings of Ghatafan tribesmen.

Soon afterward, the Dhubyan raided the Banu Amir at a place called Sahuq and captured a large number of their camels. The Banu Amir pursued the Dhubyan and in the ensuing fight were defeated and forced to retreat. Another son of al-Tufayl became separated from the tribe and hanged himself presumably to avoid death by thirst or torture at the hands of the Dhubyan. His death was satirized by the Ghatafani poets Salama ibn Khurshub al-Anmari and Urwa ibn al-Ward al-Absi. In a later battle, the Day of al-Batha'a, a son of al-Tufayl and a son of Abu Bara were killed in an abortive raid by the Banu Amir against the Abs. According to Lyall, the poetry of Amir ibn al-Tufayl indicated that there were many more battles between the Banu Amir and Ghatafan, with outcomes more favorable for the former, but details were not provided by the sources.

=== Relations with Medina ===
==== Expedition of Bir Ma'una ====
The Banu Amir had developed a reputation for military prowess in Arabia by the time the Islamic prophet Muhammad began his teachings in Mecca in the early 7th century. Despite their close ties with the Quraysh, which opposed Muhammad, the Banu Amir remained on generally peaceful terms with the nascent Muslim community; they had a mutual opponent in the Ghatafan tribes. In July 625 a party of Muslims dispatched by Muhammad to the Najd were killed at Bir Ma'una, a watering place, by Bedouin tribesmen. The traditional Islamic accounts of the event are contradictory, differing on the Muslim expedition's peaceful or military character, its aim, and the composition of the involved parties.

The expedition to the Najd had been prompted by a meeting between Abu Bara and Muhammad, where the former had declined the latter's invitation to embrace Islam, but proposed to Muhammad that a Muslim deputation be sent to proselytize in the Najd under Abu Bara's protection. The historian M. J. Kister concluded that Abu Bara, an elderly man by then, had sought to buttress his position within the tribe by backing Muhammad, but without embracing Islam. Muhammad had sought to win over at least part of the powerful Banu Amir, particularly following his military setback against his Quraysh enemies at the Battle of Uhud four months prior.

Although Abu Bara and his son, Rabi'a, promised the Muslims the protection of their tribe, the Muslims were attacked upon encountering the tribesmen of the Sulaym at Bir Ma'una, where the Sulaym encamped under the Kilab's protection. Amir ibn al-Tufayl and his cousin, Jabbar ibn Sulma, a grandson of Abu Bara, were the only two Kilabi tribesmen mentioned by name as participants in the Bedouin party. The sources generally implicate Amir ibn al-Tufayl with leading the Sulaymi assault against the Muslims. Kister placed the Sulaymi chief Anas ibn al-Abbas al-Ri'li, who sought to avenge the slaying of his nephew by the Muslims at the Battle of Badr in 624, as the assault's overall leader, but did not discount that Amir ibn al-Tufayl approved or participated in the assault.

The survivors of the attack killed two men of the Kilab on their return to Medina in revenge, prompting Muhammad to offer Abu Bara blood money for their slayings, which were judged to be illicit. Abu Bara's cooperation with Muhammad was largely seen as an aberration by the Banu Amir, and cost him his pre-eminent position in the tribe. Not long after, Abu Bara died, and was succeeded by Amir ibn al-Tufayl as leader of the Ja'far.

==== Later interactions with Muhammad ====
Relations between the Banu Amir and the Muslims remained peaceful despite the Bir Ma'una incident, but tensions followed Muhammad's calls for a religious union of the Muslims and the nomadic tribes. Amir ibn al-Tufayl and his cousin, Arbad ibn Qays, a grandson of Khalid ibn Ja'far, are held by the traditional Muslim sources to have negotiated their tribe's membership in the Muslim community with Muhammad in his capital at Medina in September/October 629, but with no result. The two Kilabi chiefs died soon after. Amir ibn al-Tufayl was succeeded as leader of the tribe by his cousin and rival, Alqama ibn Ulatha. Alqama converted to Islam, the first among the Banu Amir to do so. Other members of the Kilab counted among the early converts to Islam were al-Dahhak ibn Sufyan, a chief of the Abu Bakr, Amr ibn Bujayr of the Ru'as, and the brothers Mula ibn Abd Allah and Qudama ibn Abd Allah of the Dibab. The 8th-century historian Ibn Sa'd mentioned that in 9 AH (630/31 CE), eight delegations of the Banu Amir and its subtribes conferred with Muhammad in Medina, including one of the Kilab in general and another from the Ru'as. The first included Labid, Jabbar ibn Sulma, and al-Dahhak ibn Sufyan. An agreement was reached and Labid converted to Islam. The Ru'as deputation was headed by Amr ibn Malik ibn Qays, who afterward converted his clansmen to Islam. The historian Muhammad Mazhar Siddiqi argued that the deputations suggest the Banu Amir embraced Islam before Muhammad's death in 632.

Al-Dahhak, and his kinsman, al-Asyad ibn Salama, led an expedition against the Qurata clan of the Abu Bakr, to which al-Asyad belonged, and which had rejected Islam. (Note: The Qurata clan consisted of the descendants of Qurt, Qurayt and Qarit, who were sons of the Abd or Abd Allah branches of the Abu Bakr division.) According to the history of al-Waqidi (d. 823) the expedition was launched in April 630. Caskel considered a raid against the Qurata in 630 to be improbable and the alternative dating of 627/28 to be more likely. In the major Battle of Hunayn in 630, which followed the general conversion of the Quraysh to Islam, the Kilab did not participate alongside their Hawazin affiliates against Muhammad. Afterward, the Banu Amir completed their union with the Muslims.

==== Ridda wars and Muslim conquests ====
Alqama left Islam before or soon after the death of Muhammad in 632. Most chiefs of the Bedouin tribes also left the faith or threw off allegiance to the Muslim state in Medina around this time. This led to the Ridda wars, in which Muhammad's successor as leader of the Muslims, Caliph Abu Bakr (r. 632–634), dispatched expeditions to rein in the tribes. In the account placing Alqama's apostasy after Muhammad's death, he was targeted in an expedition by Khalid ibn al-Walid, and consequently declared his Muslim faith and made peace with Abu Bakr. In the account placing his defection before Muhammad died, he was said to have fled to Byzantine Syria following the Battle of Hunayn. Afterward, he returned to his tribe's protection in the Najd before eventually embracing Islam once again and becoming an important ally of Abu Bakr. There was little conflict reported between the Banu Amir and Medina during the Ridda wars. The tribe generally took a neutral position until joining the Muslim side after Khalid ibn al-Walid routed the Ghatafan and Asad at the Battle of Buzakha.

The Banu Amir played a minor role in the early Muslim conquests of the 630s–640s, in which the Sasanian Empire, i.e. Iraq and Iran, and a large part of the Byzantine Empire, namely Syria and Egypt, came under Islamic rule. Alqama may have been appointed the governor of the Hauran, a region in southern Syria, by Abu Bakr's successor Umar (r. 634–644). Following the conquests, groups of the Kilab settled in northern Syria and the western Jazira (see below).

=== Activity in Arabia until the 10th century ===
The caliphs in Medina founded the Hima Dariyya, located on the Kilab's stomping grounds, as a reserved area for the state around the 640s–650s, exacerbating the existing tensions between the Ja'far on one side and the Abu Bakr and Dibab on the other over territory. Otherwise, there was little change among the sub-tribes of the Kilab and the Banu Amir in central Arabia. A member of the Ru'as, Abu Du'ad, became a prominent Bedouin poet in the Hejaz and participated in the disputes of the Kilab in Arabia before his death in 700. Another poet of the Kilab, the highwayman Tahman ibn Amr, lived as a wandering poet in the Yamama and Yemen during the reign of the Umayyad caliph al-Walid I (r. 705–715). Members of the Qurata clan were settled in Medina by 762, during Abbasid rule (post-750), when one of its members, Rashid ibn Hayyan ibn Abi Sulayman ibn Sam'an, defected from the cause of the Alid rebel Muhammad al-Nafs al-Zakiyya upon the approach of an Abbasid army.

The Kilab, Numayr, and Qushayr were involved in the Bedouin uprisings in central Arabia during the reign of the Abbasid caliph al-Wathiq (r. 842–847) until they were suppressed by the caliph's general Bugha al-Kabir in 845. He summoned them via his emissaries, whereupon about 3,000 Kilabi tribesmen arrived to submit to him. He detained 1,300 of them whom he accused of criminal acts, imprisoning them in Medina before taking part of them to Baghdad. Two years later, the Abbasids eliminated the Numayr in their long-held areas northeast of the Dariyya, after which the Kilab and the Uqayl began to migrate there. The 10th-century military expeditions of the Qarmatians of Bahrayn, whose forces consisted of the Banu Amir and other Bedouin tribesmen, initiated a new wave of Kilabi migration out of Arabia into Syria (see below).

== Iraq and the east ==
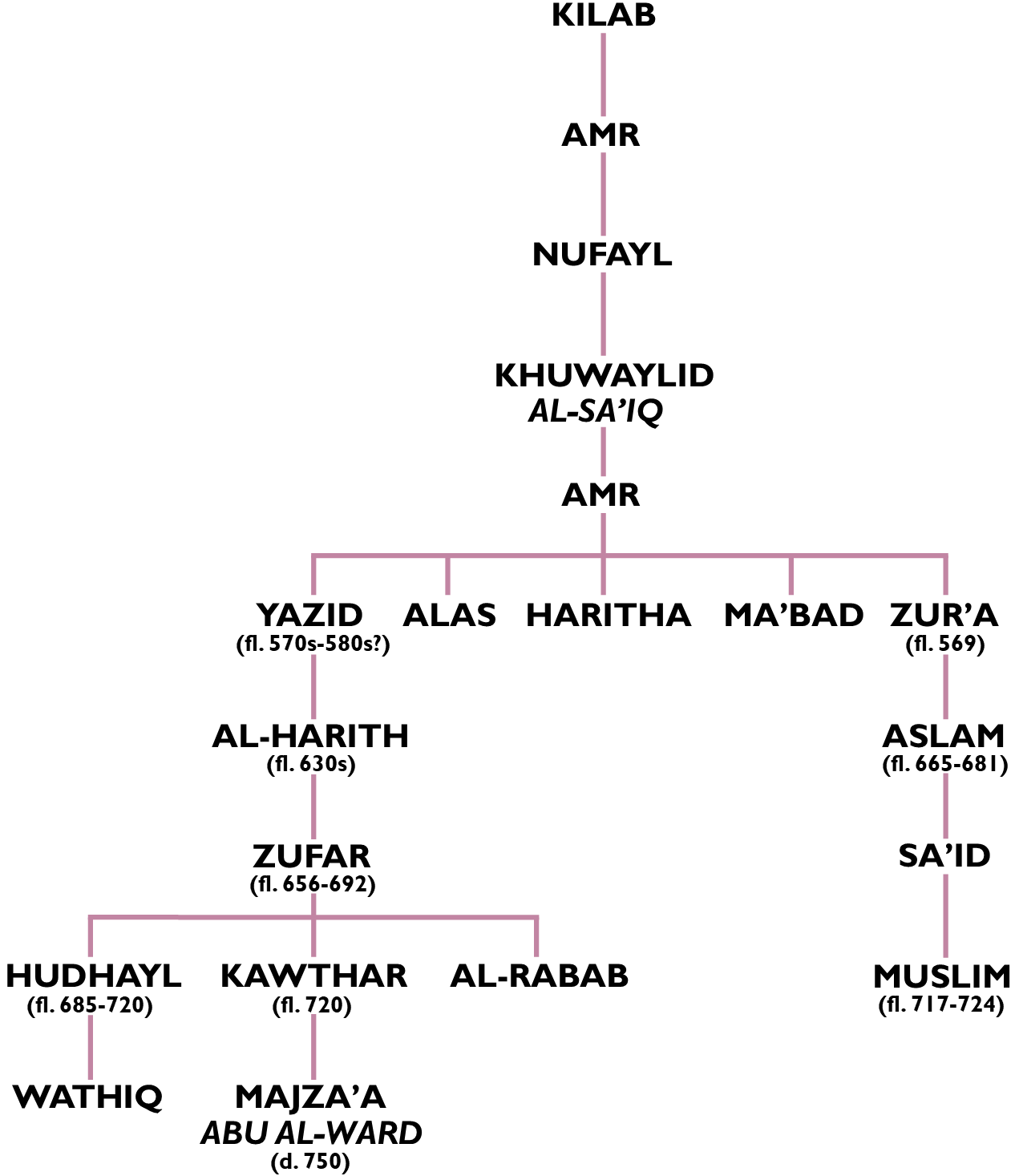
Genealogical tree of the Amr division of the Kilab. Two members of the clan, Aslam ibn Zur'a and Zufar ibn al-Harith, and their descendants were preeminent leaders of the Qays tribes in Basra and Qinnasrin (north Syria), respectively

Several Kilabi tribesmen settled in the Muslim garrison towns of Basra and Kufa in Iraq, which were established in the late 630s following the Muslim conquest of the region. From the Amr division, Aslam ibn Zur'a and the commander al-Harith ibn Yazid and his son, Zufar ibn al-Harith, descendants of Yazid ibn al-Sa'iq, settled in Basra. According to the historian Suhayl Zakkar, the Amr division "was always distinguished by its militant and warlike attitude". Zufar migrated to the Jazira (Upper Mesopotamia) during the First Muslim Civil War (656–661) and became a leader of the Qays tribes there (see below), while Aslam remained, and later served as the sub-governor of Khurasan (northeastern frontier of the caliphate) for the Umayyad caliph Mu'awiya I in the 670s. He was a major leader of the Qaysi tribesmen, who formed a significant faction of the Muslim garrisons of Basra and Khurasan. Aslam's son, Sa'id, served as governor of Makran (southeastern Iran) under the viceroy of Iraq al-Hajjaj ibn Yusuf (r. 694–714). His grandson Muslim ibn Sa'id was adopted by al-Hajjaj after Sa'id's death and served as the governor of Khurasan in 723–724. Two other members of the Kilab were recorded in the sources as sub-governors under al-Hajjaj: Qatan ibn Mudrik, who was appointed over Basra, and Muhammad ibn al-Sa'sa, who was appointed over Bahrayn and Oman.

From the Dibab division, Shimr, a son of one of Muhammad's companions, Dhu al-Jawshan ibn al-A'war, settled in Kufa, where he became a chief of the tribe. Although originally a backer of Caliph Ali against the Umayyads, he switched allegiance to the latter and became notorious for his killing of Ali's son Husayn in 680. He was killed in revenge by the pro-Alid ruler of Kufa Mukhtar al-Thaqafi (r. 685–687), after which his sons resettled in the Jazira. (Note: Al-Hajjaj initially appointed a grandson of Dhu al-Jawshan, Ubayd Allah ibn Hujr, to lead what became known as the "Peacock army" to an expedition against Sistan, but replaced him with Ibn al-Ash'ath.) Also killed in Kufa by Mukhtar in 686 was a descendant of Labid, Malik ibn Hizam ibn Rabi'a; Labid had settled in Kufa following the conquest.

A member of the Kilab, Abd Allah ibn Hilal, was the sole Qaysi in the Iraqi viceregal administration of Yazid ibn al-Muhallab (715–717), who appointed him the sub-governor of Basra. The family of the Kilabi tribesman Nubata ibn Hanzala, who had participated in the Umayyad siege of Mecca in 692, settled in Iraq during the Third Muslim Civil War (744–747) and became leaders of the Qays there. Nubata was dispatched by the viceroy of Iraq, Yazid ibn Umar ibn Hubayra, to Jurjan in Iran, where he fell fighting the forces of rebel leader Qahtaba ibn Shabib. Nubata's son Muhammad was the sub-governor of Wasit and was among the Qaysi nobles executed by the Abbasids after they captured the city in 749.

The Ubayd clan of the Ru'as had also established itself in Kufa following the conquests. When the Kharijite rebel Shabib ibn Yazid al-Shaybani invaded Kufa in 696, a member of the clan, Abu Hamid Abd al-Rahman ibn Awf, led the city's defense. The clan produced a number of luminaries, including the prominent hadith scholar Waki ibn al-Jarrah, whose father al-Jarrah ibn Malih had been the supervisor of the treasury in Baghdad under Caliph Harun al-Rashid (r. 786–809). Waki was one of the principal teachers of Ahmad ibn Hanbal (780–855), the founder of the Hanbali school of jurisprudence. His son Sufyan was also a transmitter, though of lesser reputation.

== Syria ==
=== Early migrations and leadership of the Qays ===
Clans from the Abu Bakr, Amr, Abd Allah, Dibab and Ja'far migrated to Syria during and soon after the Muslim conquest of that region in the 630s, constituting the first major wave of Kilabi settlement in Syria. The Kilab first established themselves in the area west of the northern Euphrates valley in Jund Qinnasrin (military district of northern Syria). The Bujayyid and Bijad clans of the Ru'as settled in Damascus. Many of the Kilabi newcomers were brought in as troops by Mu'awiya I during his governorship of Syria (640s–661). During Mu'awiya's caliphate (661–680), the chief of the Ja'far was Abd Allah ibn Bishr, a grandson of Abu Bara. He was involved in a dispute of an unspecified nature with the chief of the Abu Bakr, Abd al-Aziz ibn Zurara ibn Jaz. The latter was slain in the army of Mu'awiya's son and future successor Yazid I, during a campaign against the Byzantines in 669.

==== Banu Zufar of Qinnasrin ====
The deaths of caliphs Yazid I (r. 680–683) and Mu'awiya II (r. 683–684) left Syria in political disarray. Zufar, who had established himself in Jund Qinnasrin and led the district's troops against anti-Umayyad rebels in the Hejaz in 683, revolted against the Umayyads and gave his allegiance to their Hejaz-based challenger, Caliph Abd Allah ibn al-Zubayr. The tribe of Banu Kalb, which was maritally linked to the Umayyads and had held a privileged position in the court and army to the chagrin of the Qays, backed the Umayyad Marwan ibn al-Hakam as caliph. Zufar dispatched the troops of Qinnasrin to join the Qaysi-backed governor of Damascus, Dahhak ibn Qays al-Fihri, against the Umayyad–Kalb coalition at the Battle of Marj Rahit near Damascus in 684, during which Dahhak was killed and the Qays routed. Consequently, Zufar fled to the Jaziran town of Qarqisiya, expelled its Umayyad governor, and fortified and established it as a center of Qaysi resistance to the Umayyads. At the head of the Qays, he oversaw a series of raids and counter-raids against the Kalb in the Syrian steppe.

In 691, Marwan's successor, Abd al-Malik, made an agreement with Zufar whereby the latter defected from Ibn al-Zubayr in exchange for a prominent position in the Umayyad court and military. The Qays–Kalb feud persisted through 694, during which Umayyad princes backed one side against the other depending on their maternal affiliations with the tribes; Abd al-Malik's half-brother Bishr ibn Marwan, whose mother was Abd Allah ibn Bishr's sister, Qutayya, sponsored the Qays.

Zufar's sons, Hudhayl and Kawthar, who were particularly active during the reigns of caliphs Sulayman (r. 715–717) and Umar II (r. 717–720), were regarded as preeminent chiefs of the Qays and were highly respected by the caliphs. Hudhayl served in the army of Abd al-Malik's son, Maslama (d. 728), with whom Zufar's family had formed marital links and established neighboring residences in Jund Qinnasrin.

After the Umayyad rout at the Battle of Zab in 750 and the subsequent takeover of Syria by the armies of the Abbasid Revolution, a son of Kawthar, Abu al-Ward Majza'a, who was a commander under the Umayyad caliph Marwan II, recognized Abbasid authority. Not long after, he and his brother Abu al-Wazi led their Qaysi partisans in a pro-Umayyad revolt against the Abbasids in reaction to the harassment of Maslama's family by Abbasid troops from Khurasan. The Qays were routed and Abu al-Ward, his brother, their kinsmen and many of their supporters were slain.

==== Banu Bayhas of Damascus ====
Another prominent Kilabi family in Syria was the Banu Bayhas of Damascus, from the Dibab division. Their founder, Bayhas ibn Zumayl al-Kilabi, was keeper of the seal of the Umayyad caliph al-Walid II (r. 743–744) and was in the caliph's entourage when it was attacked by the rebel Umayyad prince, and al-Walid's successor, Yazid III (r. 744–744). One of the sons of Bayhas, Kardam, served as the governor of Oman in the Iraqi viceroyal administration of Yusuf ibn Umar al-Thaqafi (738–744). The family remained active during the Abbasid period, when another son of Bayhas, Salih, was dispatched by Harun al-Rashid to the Byzantine capital Constantinople in 800 to secure the release of Muslim prisoners of war held by the Byzantines.

Two sons of Salih, Muhammad (commonly known as Ibn Bayhas) and Yahya, took control of Damascus during the instability following the Fourth Muslim Civil War (811–813). Ibn Bayhas was esteemed by the Syrian Qays as a noted warrior and poet in the feuds with the Yaman, a coalition of the Kalb and southern Arab tribes and enemies of the Qays. Unlike most of the Syrian Qays, he was generally supportive of the Abbasids. During the revolt of the Yamani-backed Umayyad Abu al-Umaytir al-Sufyani, who had taken over Damascus and attacked Qaysi villages in its periphery, Ibn Bayhas rallied the Qays of the area and besieged Damascus from his camp in the Ghouta. He became ill during the ensuing battles, and nominated the Umayyad Maslama ibn Ya'qub, a descendant of Maslama, to lead his supporters. Maslama ibn Ya'qub ultimately seized power in Damascus in rebellion against the Abbasids. Ibn Bayhas recovered, and drove Maslama ibn Ya'qub and Abu al-Umaytir out of the city in 813. They died shortly after in the nearby village of Mezzeh.

Ibn Bayhas's governorship of Damascus was recognized by Caliph al-Ma'mun (r. 813–833), to whom Ibn Bayhas had been consistently loyal, and he remained in office until 823, when Abd Allah ibn Tahir was appointed governor-general over Syria and Egypt. Ibn Bayhas was a practically independent ruler, as shown by the fact that he minted coins in his name. He also empowered the Qays in the province, and put down an Umayyad rebellion, this time led by a descendant of Caliph Uthman (r. 644–656), Sa'id ibn Khalid al-Faddayni. Another Kilabi leader, called Ibn Bayhas, likely a member of the same family, was among the tribal nobles to support a rebellion against the Abbasid caliphs al-Mu'tasim (r. 833–842) and al-Wathiq (r. 842–847) by another Umayyad pretender in 841.

=== Dominance of northern Syria ===
During the reign of Caliph al-Mutawakkil (r. 847–861), law and order began to break down throughout Syria, and this process accelerated in the years following his death. The political vacuum and frequent revolts paved the way for the Kilab to strengthen their influence in northern Syria. Sometime during the 9th century, a second major wave of Kilabi tribesmen, likely from the Amr division, migrated to the area from Arabia. By the time Ahmad ibn Tulun, the nominal Abbasid governor of Egypt, conquered Syria in 878, the "Kilab ... established themselves as a force to be reckoned with", according to the historian Kamal Salibi. In 882, the Kilab provided critical assistance to Ibn Tulun in his suppression of two uprisings, the first led by an Abbasid prince and the second by his own rebel governor of northern Syria. Both rebellions were apparently backed by older-established Arab tribes and peasant clans whose lands were being encroached upon by the Kilab.

The Kilab firmly established themselves as the predominant tribe in the region north of the Palmyrene steppe and west of the Euphrates in the early to mid-10th century. At that time, a third major wave of Kilabi migrants, principally from the Awf branch of the Abu Bakr division, invaded northern Syria; the medieval Aleppine chronicler Ibn al-Adim puts the date of the Kilabi invasion at 932 and states that the tribesmen largely came from the Abu Bakr clans of Subaya and Dhu'ayba. The 10th-century chronicler and genealogist, Muhammad ibn Ahmad ibn Abdallah al-Asadi, noted the presence in northern Syria of tribesmen of the Kilabi divisions of Abu Bakr, Amr, Abd Allah and Dibab, but not the Ja'far. Zakkar interpreted this as an indication that the latter had assimilated into the urban or rural population by then.

The 10th-century Kilabi invasion may have been encouraged or directly supported by the Qarmatian movement, a radical millennarian Shi'ite Isma'ili sect that had spread from southern Iraq in the second half of the 9th century. The Qarmatians, whose troops largely consisted of Bedouin tribes, launched a series of uprisings Syria in the 10th century, the first occurring in 902. According to the historian Hugh Kennedy, these campaigns "led to fundamental changes in the distribution and relative strengths of the bedouin tribes in the Syrian and Arabian deserts", and was the most important such realignment of the Arab tribes until the 18th century. The Kilab and other branches of the Banu Amir provided the bulk of the Qarmatians' military personnel. At the time, the Arab tribes of Syria and Mesopotamia experienced marked population growth, which coincided with rising grain prices. This, according to historian Thierry Bianquis, made the tribes "susceptible to Qarmatian [sic] propaganda denouncing the wealth of the urban Sunni population and the luxury of the pilgrimage caravans". The tribes frequently raided the agricultural lands of Hama, Ma'arrat al-Nu'man and Salamiyah, but nonetheless integrated well with the rural population due to their shared Shi'ite faith.

In 937, the Kilabi newcomers captured Ma'arrat al-Nu'man, plundered the surrounding countryside and took captive its governor and local garrison after the latter put up resistance. The dominance of the Kilabi Bedouins prevented Muhammad ibn Tughj al-Ikhshid (r. 935–946), the ruler of Egypt and southern Syria, from effectively governing northern Syria, which he had conquered in the late 930s. He formed an alliance with part of the Kilab, appointing Ahmad ibn Sa'id ibn al-Abbas al-Kilabi, from the Amr division, as governor of Aleppo in 939. In the months after, al-Ikhshid's forces were driven out of northern Syria by the Abbasids. Between 941 and 944, the political situation in northern Syria was fluid, and at one point, al-Ikhshid reoccupied the region. Al-Ikhshid appointed Ahmad ibn Sa'id as governor of Antioch and the latter's brother, Uthman, as governor of Aleppo.

=== Emirate of Aleppo ===
==== Relations with the Hamdanid dynasty ====
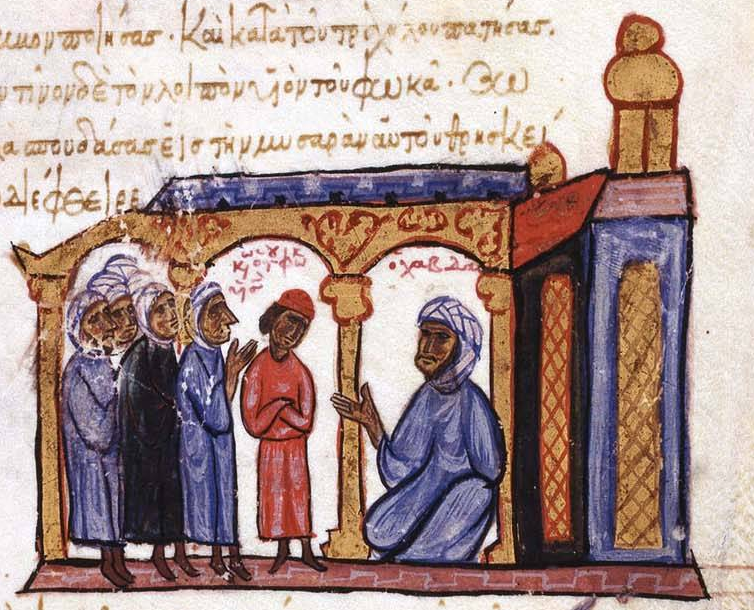
Depiction of Sayf al-Dawla and his court. Sayf al-Dawla was able to take control of Aleppo from its Kilabi governor, Uthman ibn Sa'id, with the assistance of resentful Kilabi chieftains. The Kilab were a major element of Sayf al-Dawla's military and often rebelled and reconciled with Sayf.

The appointments of Ahmad and Uthman aroused the jealousy of other Kilabi chieftains. Seeking to replace their kinsmen, they invited Nasir al-Dawla, the Hamdanid ruler of Mosul, to invade Aleppo with their assistance. Nasir al-Dawla's brother, Sayf al-Dawla, entered Aleppo in October 944 and was greeted by Uthman, who took Sayf on a tour of each of the villages in Aleppo's domain. Ibn al-Adim asserts that the internal divisions among the Kilab enabled Sayf al-Dawla to successfully establish himself in Aleppo. Sayf al-Dawla later enlisted Kilabi tribesmen in his failed attempt to conquer Ikhshidid-controlled southern Syria in 946. However, due to incessant Bedouin raids against his subjects, Sayf al-Dawla expelled most of the tribes of northern Syria to the Jazira. The Kilab was an exception, being the only tribe authorized to inhabit northern Syria. They entered into conflict with Sayf at some point, but by the time he died in 967, he had granted the Kilab aman (pardon).

Throughout the 10th and 11th centuries, the Kilab "represented an organised military force with powerful cavalry trained in mounted swordsmanship and not fearing to confront a government army on the field of battle", according to Bianquis. Salibi notes that the northern Syrian Kilab's main military assets were their "Bedouin swiftness of movement" and their kinship connections with the Kilab in the Jazira. The tribe "served those who paid most and often, at a time of crisis, would sell their employer to the highest bidder", according to Zakkar. And so it was with both the Hamdanids and their opponents; Kilabi tribes were involved in every Hamdanid struggle with the Byzantines, every uprising against the Hamdanids, and in intra-dynastic conflicts over the emirate of Aleppo. In return for helping their employers secure victory on the battlefield, the Kilab expected from them grants of iqta'at (income-producing properties; sing. iqta). Sayf al-Dawla's successor, Sa'd al-Dawla (r. 967–991), had five hundred Bedouin warriors from the Amr in his army in 983, indicating the large size of that Kilabi division. Meanwhile, Bakjur, Sa'd al-Dawla's rebellious ghulam (slave soldier), had his own contingent of Kilabi warriors when he fought against Sa'd al-Dawla in 991.

In 1008–1009, the Kilab were employed by a Byzantine-Marwanid alliance to help install Sa'd al-Dawla's son, Abu'l Hayja, as the emir of Aleppo to replace Mansur ibn Lu'lu', who as ruler of the emirate had allied himself with the Fatimid Caliphate. However, the Kilab collaborated with the Fatimids and betrayed the Marwanids. When the Fatimids turned against Mansur in 1011–1012 and gained promises of Kilabi support to restore Hamdanid rule in Aleppo, the Kilab betrayed the Fatimids. Thus, the tribe "saved Mansur b. Lu'lu' on two occasions by their inaction", according to Bianquis. In return, the Kilab demanded from Mansur iqta'at in the emirate, villages to supply them with grain, and fertile pastures and rangelands around Aleppo to graze their sheep and horses. To relieve his obligations to the Kilab, Mansur employed a ruse whereby he invited 1,000 Kilabi tribesmen to a feast at his palace in Aleppo on 27 May 1012, only to trap and assault the tribesmen. Those among the Kilabi invitees who were not massacred were imprisoned in the dungeons of the Citadel of Aleppo.

==== Takeover of the emirate under Salih ibn Mirdas ====
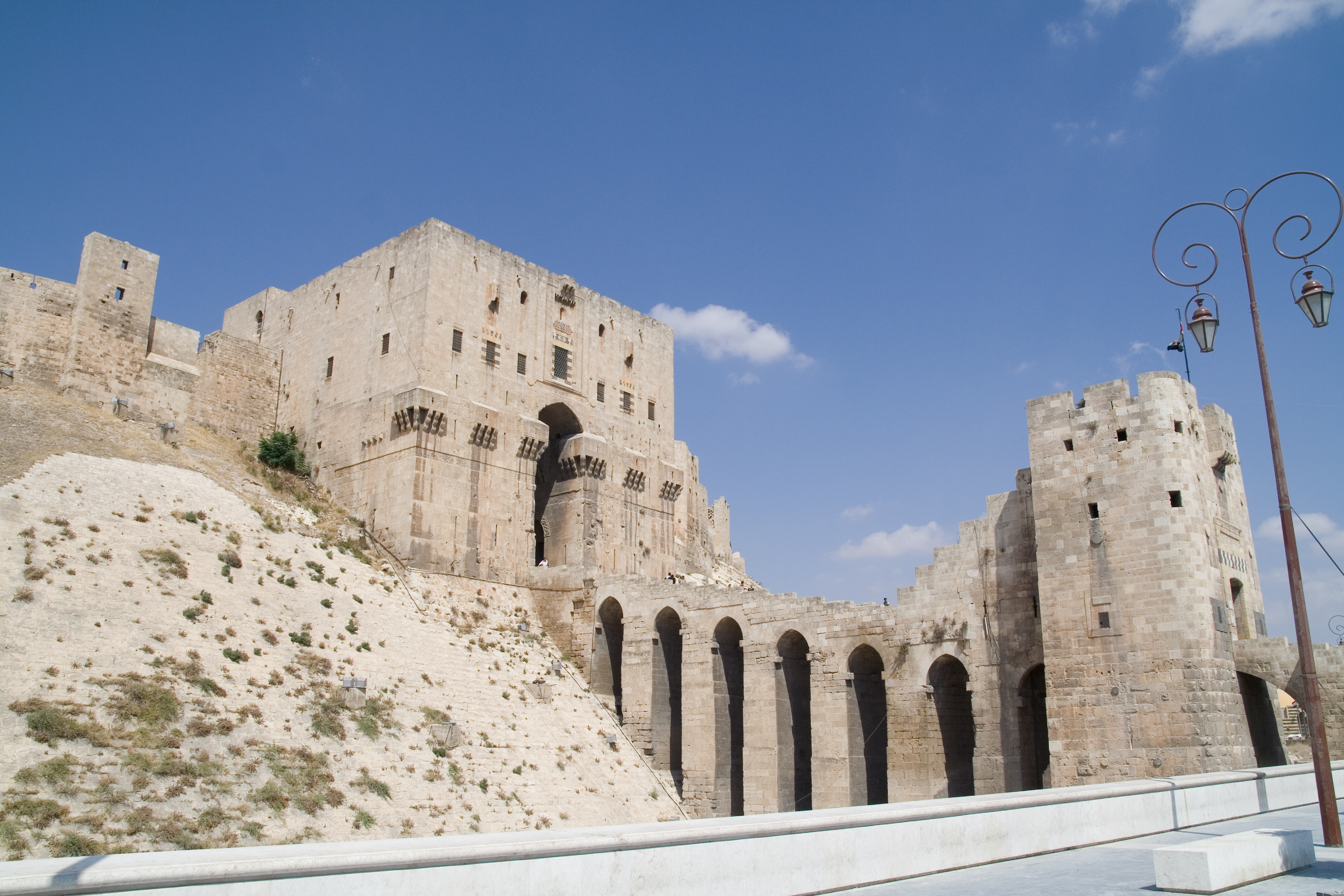
Hundreds of Kilabi tribesmen and chieftains were imprisoned in the dungeons of Aleppo's citadel (pictured) by Mansur ibn Lu'lu' in 1012. Two years later, Salih ibn Mirdas escaped the citadel, captured Mansur and exchanged him for the remaining Kilabi prisoners. In 1025, Salih captured Aleppo and made it the capital of his Mirdasid emirate.

Upon hearing of Mansur's actions, Muqallid ibn Za'ida, a Kilabi emir from Aleppo's outskirts, launched an assault against Kafartab to pressure Mansur; the latter responded by relocating his Kilabi prisoners to facilities with better conditions, and gave favorable treatment to Muqallid's brothers, Abu Hamid and Jami'. However, after Muqallid was killed and the Kilab aborted their siege of Kafartab, Mansur returned the prisoners to the dungeons, where many Kilabi chieftains were tortured, executed or died of poor conditions.

Among the Kilabi prisoners was Salih ibn Mirdas, an emir from a princely family belonging to the Abu Bakr division, who had captured al-Rahba in 1008–1009. Salih was subjected to particularly brutal torture and humiliation by Mansur. Mansur forced a few Kilabi chieftains to accept his terms and had them released in 1013, but most Kilabi prisoners remained incarcerated, including Salih, whose "boldness and resentment increased" as a result, according to Zakkar. Salih escaped from the citadel in 1014 and rallied his surviving tribesmen at their encampments in Marj Dabiq. The Kilab united behind Salih, who soon after led them in their siege against Aleppo.

The Kilab and Mansur's army of ghilman clashed several times, and Mansur was able to inflict losses on the Kilab and plunder part of their camp. Encouraged by this, Mansur recruited local toughs, including many Aleppine Jews and Christians, and confronted Salih's Kilabi warriors at the outskirts of Aleppo on 13 August 1014. The Kilab routed Mansur's army, killing some 2,000 Aleppine irregulars and capturing Mansur and his senior commanders. Nonetheless, the Kilab were unable to capture Aleppo, which was defended by Mansur's brothers and mother. Negotiations for Mansur's release concluded with the release of the Kilabi prisoners and a promise to assign to the Kilab half of the emirate of Aleppo's revenues. Moreover, Salih was recognized by Mansur as the supreme emir of the Kilab.

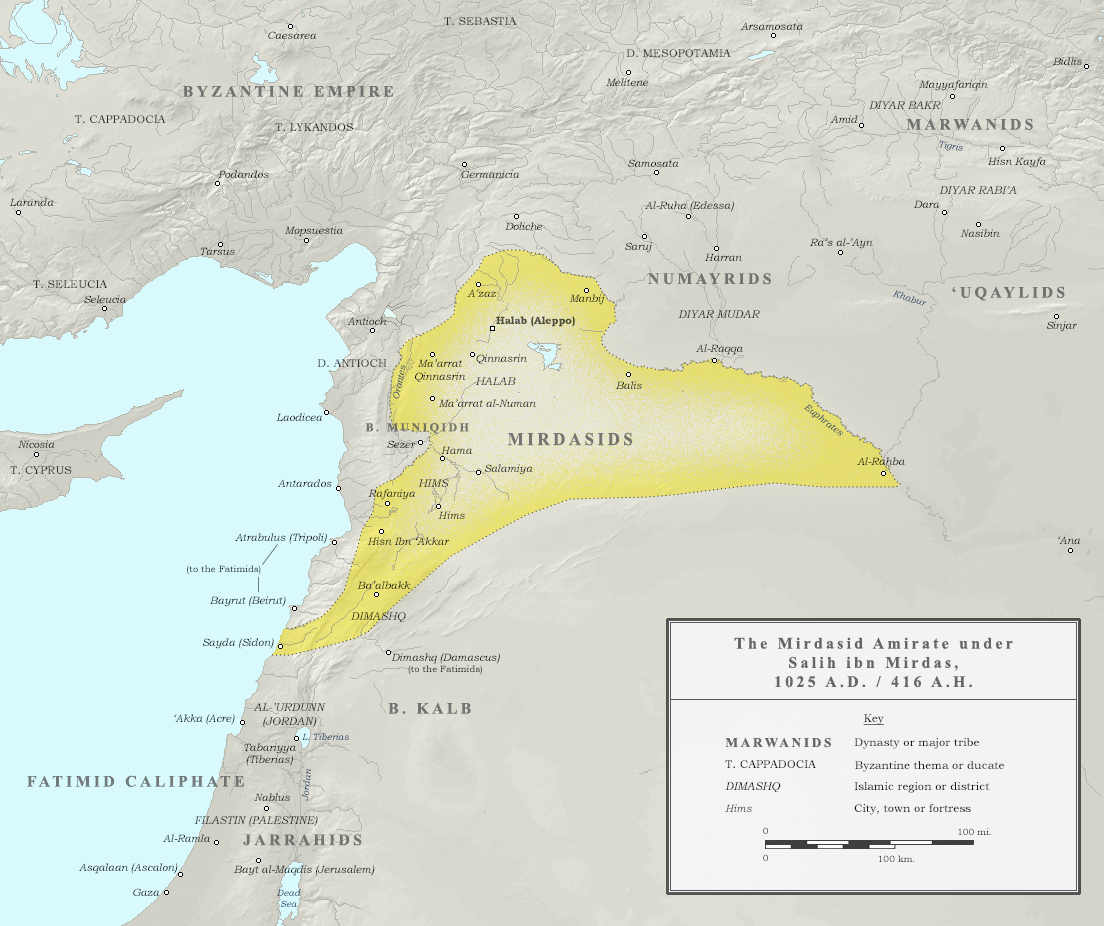
Map of the Mirdasid emirate of Aleppo at its height under Salih ibn Mirdas, c. 1024

In the following years, Salih consolidated his authority over the Kilab and expanded his emirate to include the important Euphrates fortress towns of Manbij and Balis. Mansur did not follow through on his pledge to hand over to the Kilab their share of Aleppo's revenues, provoking Kilabi raids against Aleppo's countryside. In 1016, Mansur fled Aleppo after the commander of its citadel, Fath al-Qal'i, revolted. Salih persuaded Fath to abide by Mansur's promises to the Kilab, but Fath ceded Aleppo to the Fatimids, to Salih's chagrin. The Kilab were not strong enough to challenge the Fatimids, but friendly relations were established between Salih and the new Fatimid governor, Aziz al-Dawla. By the time the latter was assassinated in 1022, Salih had added the towns of Rafaniyah and Raqqa to his emirate. In 1024, an alliance was formed between the Kilab and the Kalb and Tayy, the strongest Arab tribes in central Syria and Transjordan, respectively. Salih's forces captured Aleppo that year, along with Homs, Baalbek, Sidon and Hisn Akkar, while the Fatimids' hold on the rest of Syria was considerably weakened. Salih "brought to success the plan which had guided his [Kilabi] forebears for a century" with his capture of Aleppo, according to Bianquis.

In 1028, the Fatimid governor of Syria, Anushtakin al-Dizbari, moved against the Kilab and the Tayy, having secured the defection of the Kalb. Opposed to Tayyi/Jarrahid domination of Palestine and Mirdasid control of central Syria, Dizbari confronted Salih and the Jarrahid emir Hassan ibn Mufarrij at the Battle of al-Uqhuwana near Tiberias in 1029. Salih was slain and Dizbari seized the Mirdasids' central Syrian domains.

==== Reigns of Nasr and Thimal ====
Salih had designated his son, Thimal, as his successor, but his eldest son, Nasr, a survivor of al-Uqhuwana, also sought the emirate. At the same time, the two brothers faced an imminent offensive by the Byzantine emperor Romanos III in 1030. Thimal remained in Aleppo with the bulk of their forces, while Nasr led the rest of his Kilabi horsemen to confront the Byzantines. The Mirdasids landed a major victory against Romanos III at the Battle of Azaz. Nasr seized the citadel of Aleppo while his brother was away. Thimal mobilized his Kilabi partisans to oust Nasr, but ultimately the chiefs of the tribe mediated a power-sharing agreement between the brothers, whereby Nasr ruled the northern Syrian part of the emirate from Aleppo and Thimal ruled the Jaziran part from al-Rahba.

Nasr entered Byzantine vassalage soon after the Battle of Azaz to ward off multiple threats: his own tribesmen, 20,000 tribesmen from the hostile Tayy and Kalb tribes who relocated to Byzantine territory close to Aleppo, as well as the Fatimids. After the Byzantines and Fatimids made peace in 1036, Nasr reconciled with the Fatimid caliph, who granted his request for the governorship of Homs. Dizbari, who sought control of all of Syria, opposed Nasr's acquisition of Homs. He recruited Tayyi and Kalbi tribesmen, and a Kilabi faction opposed to the Mirdasids, secured Byzantine approval, and marched against Nasr. The latter was defeated and killed outside Hama in 1038.

Thimal gained control of Aleppo after Nasr's death, but withdrew in the face of Dizbari's army. Thimal left his cousin, Muqallid ibn Kamil, in charge of the citadel, and their Kilabi kinsman, Khalifa ibn Jabir, in charge of the city. They surrendered to Dizbari in June, and Fatimid rule was restored in Aleppo. Dizbari consecrated ties with the Kilab by marrying the daughter of the Kilabi chieftain Mansur ibn Zughayb. Thimal continued to control the Jaziran part of the emirate. After Dizbari died in 1042, Thimal regained control of Aleppo with Fatimid approval. Contravening his agreement with the Fatimids, Thimal forwarded only part of the treasure stockpiled by Dizbari in Aleppo to the Fatimids. In 1048, the Fatimids sent an army—including a Kalb-dominated Bedouin contingent—against him, led by the Hamdanid descendant Nasir al-Dawla. Thimal and his Kilabi troops were unable to repulse them and were besieged in Aleppo. Nasir al-Dawla retreated to Damascus after floods destroyed his equipment and killed many of his troops, after which Thimal recaptured Ma'arrat al-Nu'man and Hama. Another Fatimid army was sent, this one led by Rifq, and composed of Fatimid troops and tribesmen of the Kalb, Fazara and Tayy. Thimal sent an advance force of Kilabi tribesmen led by Muqallid ibn Kamil, which successively demolished the fortifications of Ma'arrat al-Nu'man, Hama and Homs to prevent their use by the Fatimids. The Kilab then defeated the Fatimid army and captured Rifq, who died in captivity. The Mirdasids and Fatimids reconciled in 1050 and Thimal's emirate over Aleppo was reconfirmed by the caliph.

In 1056, Thimal was pressured to cede al-Rahba to the Turkish rebel al-Basasiri and al-Raqqa to the Numayrids of Harran, angering the Kilab and causing its split into two factions, one loyal to Thimal and the other to his brother Atiyya, emir of Balis, who made off with the cash Thimal had entrusted to him to deliver to al-Basasiri. The Mirdasid emirs were reconciled by a Fatimid envoy, staving off an intra-Kilabi feud. Continued dissensions among the Kilab against Thimal, al-Basasiri's presence in the emirate, the presence of a Fatimid army led by Ibn Mulhim during renewed Fatimid–Byzantine conflict in Syria, and efforts by the Fatimid court all led Thimal to cede Aleppo to Ibn Mulhim in 1057–1058 and relocate to Cairo. The political circumstances, in which the Mirdasids kept control only of Balis, left the Kilab weakened and unable to mount any attempt to recapture Aleppo.

After al-Basasiri was killed by the Seljuk sultan Tughril Bey in 1059, Atiyya recaptured al-Rahba in 1060, enthusing the Kilab to move against Aleppo. Atiyya initially switched his allegiance to the Abbasid Caliphate, prompting the Fatimids to dispatch an army, including the Kalb, to capture al-Rahba. The Kilabi chiefs warned the Fatimids not to allow the Kalb entry into their tribal territory, but the expedition proceeded. In response, the Kilab entered Jund Hims, tribal territory of the Kalb, and sacked Homs and Hama, demolishing their walls in the aftermath. Meanwhile, Thimal's Numayrid wife, al-Sayyida al-Alawiyya, engineered the takeover of Aleppo by her son from Nasr, Mahmud, who captured the city later that year with the Numayr and part of the Kilab. The subsequent defection of numerous Kilabi tribesmen to Mahmud caused a political rift within the tribe, between loyalists of Mahmud and his uncle Atiyya. The Fatimids viewed the turbulent politics in Aleppo as counter to their interests, and sent Thimal to retake the city in 1061. The bulk of the Kilab rallied to Thimal and mediated between him and Mahmud.

==== Later Mirdasid emirs, entry of the Turkmens, and weakening of Kilabi power ====
Thimal died in 1062 and was succeeded by Atiyya. The rivalry between Mahmud and Atiyya and their respective factions within the Kilab resumed. The bulk of the Kilab backed Mahmud and marched with him against Aleppo in 1063, but they were repulsed by Atiyya's Turkmen mercenaries, led by Ibn Khan. According to Zakkar, after Thimal's death "the time in which the Kilabi chieftains and tribesmen held the decisive power in the struggle for Aleppo had passed". A Mirdasid emir of the Kilab, Muqallid ibn Kamil's son Mani, was killed by the Turkmens, which sapped Kilabi morale and compelled Mahmud to agree to terms with Atiyya. In 1064 Mahmud and his Kilabi tribesmen captured Ma'arrat al-Nu'man, Hama and Kafartab before marching against Aleppo, but they were again repulsed and a settlement was reached recognizing Mahmud's control of the three captured towns. Ibn Khan and his followers were chased out of Aleppo by Atiyya in 1065 and defected to Mahmud and the Kilab in Sarmin, after which their combined forces captured Aleppo. An agreement was reached, allotting the Jaziran portion of the emirate to Atiyya. Conflict resumed between Atiyya and Mahmud in 1067, during which Atiyya had gone to Homs to recruit among the Kilab and other tribes there. Zakkar speculated that the Kilab's increasing presence in Jund Hims was due to pressures from Turkmen migrations into northern Syria and the migrations of Uqaylid tribesmen from the region of Mosul into the Kilab's Jaziran domains. Mahmud, Atiyya and their Kilabi factions were reconciled by the efforts of the Banu Ammar rulers of Tripoli later that year. The Uqaylids under Muslim ibn Quraysh captured al-Rahba from the Mirdasids in 1068 and Raqqa in 1070–1071.

In January 1071, a Seljuk army led by Sultan Alp Arslan besieged Aleppo, but could not force its surrender. Alp Arslan then summoned the Kilabi chiefs of the area and promised to confer on one of them the rulership of Aleppo, if Mahmud was ousted. To counter potential Kilabi collaboration with the Seljuks against him, Mahmud agreed to submit to Seljuk rule, and was kept in power in Aleppo by Alp Arslan. In 1072 Mahmud and his Turkmen mercenaries repulsed raids against Aleppo by the Byzantines and Atiyya, who had defected to Byzantium, and recaptured al-Rahba from the Uqaylids. Mahmud died in 1075 and was succeeded at first by his son, Nasr, and then after Nasr's death, by another son, Sabiq. The latter's dependence on the Turkmen mercenaries and the Turkmens' monopolization of power in the emirate provoked the Kilabi chiefs, who proclaimed Sabiq's brother, Waththab, as their supreme emir. The bulk of the tribe mobilized in the plain of Qinnasrin in preparation for an assault on Aleppo, but they were ambushed by the Turkmen cavalries and dispersed at great cost in booty. Waththab and the Kilabi chiefs Mubarak ibn Shibl and Hamid ibn Zughayb went to the court of the Seljuk sultan Malik-Shah to seek his assistance against Sabiq, which Malik-Shah agreed to. Malik-Shah sent an army to Syria, led by Tutush I, who was accompanied by the disaffected Kilabi chiefs and their tribesmen, as well as Muslim ibn Quraysh. Muslim ibn Quraysh secretly opposed a Seljuk takeover of Aleppo and collaborated with Sabiq, admonishing the Kilabi chiefs for supporting Turkmens against their own kin. He persuaded the Kilabi chiefs to desert at the gates of Aleppo and persuaded Waththab and his brother Shabib to join forces with Sabiq. Tutush maintained the siege, but a troop of Seljuk reinforcements was massacred by the Kilab, Uqayl, Numayr and Qushayr led by Muslim ibn Quraysh near Sinjar. Tutush left the siege to assault Kilabi tribesmen in the Aleppo region, but was unable to pursue them into the desert.

In the course of the Seljuk siege of Aleppo, the primary motivations for the defection of Muslim ibn Quraysh and the Kilab to Sabiq, as indicated in contemporary poems by Ibn Hayyus and communications recorded in the chronicles of Ibn al-Adim and Sibt ibn al-Jawzi, were their tribal kinship ties and mutual desire to preserve Bedouin Arab rule in Aleppo. Accordingly, Sabiq appealed to his brothers and the Kilabi chief, Abu Za'ida Muhammad ibn Za'ida, that he was "defending" their "land and authority", and that, should Tutush capture Aleppo, he would demolish the "mulk al-Arab" (the rulership of the Bedouin Arabs), and to preserve the last Arab principality in Syria from Turkish invasion. Tutush captured Kilab-held fortresses near Aleppo, including Azaz, while Abu Za'ida massacred any groups of Turkmen cavalries he could find. Bianquis called it "a very hard war, paid for by the peasants and merchants". Tutush captured Damascus, and his deputy Afshin pillaged the villages around Rafaniyya, Ma'arrat al-Nu'man and the Jabal al-Summaq, massacring the men, raping or capturing the women and children, so that by the time he moved eastward into the Jazira "the plain of northern Syria no longer had a single village intact", in the words of Bianquis.

==== Collapse of the emirate and decline of the Kilab ====
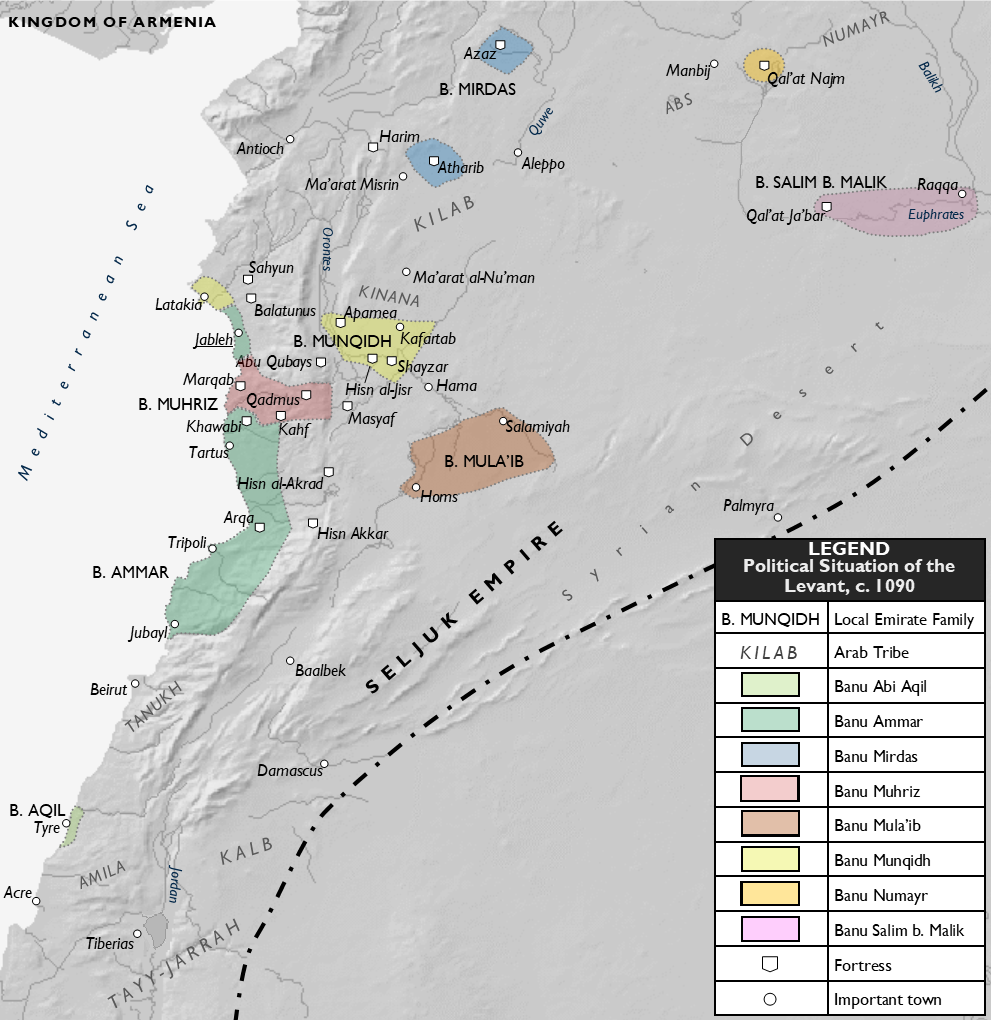
Political map of the Levant, c. 1090, showing areas retained by the Mirdasid emirs Shabib and Waththab (shaded in blue) and the dwelling area of most of the Kilab in northern Syria

The devastation in northern Syria opened the way for Muslim ibn Quraysh to gain control of Aleppo in 1080, when Sabiq, Shabib and Waththab were compelled by the Kilab and the Aleppines, desperate from famine, and their Munqidhite vizier, to hand over the city. Thus, Mirdasid rule in Aleppo came to a permanent end, though Muslim ibn Quraysh allotted the iqta'at of Atharib, Azaz, and another in the vicinity of Rahba to Shabib, Waththab, and Sabiq, respectively. Muslim ibn Quraysh was backed by the Kilab, for he fit their need for a strong leader in a time of severe political and economic crisis, amid the conflict with Tutush and Afshin. By the end of the year, Muslim ibn Quraysh ruled an area spanning Mosul, Aleppo, Harran, Antioch, Edessa and Hama. He retook the iqta'at he had assigned to the Mirdasid brothers, and captured Homs from its Kilabi ruler Khalaf ibn Mula'ib, but kept him in his post after Munqidhite mediation. The Mirdasid brothers and Ibn Mula'ib allied with Tutush in Damascus against Muslim ibn Quraysh, who besieged Damascus. The troops of Tutush included Kilabi tribesmen, in addition to the Uqayl, Kalb, Tayy, Ulaym and Numayr. The Uqaylid emir was defeated and retreated to his Jaziran domains. After the Seljuk commander Sulayman ibn Qutulmush captured Antioch in 1083, he gained the support of the Mirdasid brothers and their Kilabi partisans against Muslim ibn Quraysh. The Uqaylid emir was defeated and killed in battle with the Seljuks at the Afrin River in 1085, and direct Seljuk rule was introduced to Aleppo later that year. As a recompense, the Seljuks gave two Uqaylid emirs control over the Jaziran fortresses of Qal'at Ja'bar, Raqqa, Rahba, Harran, Saruj and the Khabur Valley, which Zakkar noted was an indication "that the tribe of Kilab lost its footing and traditional power in the [Jaziran] territory". In 1090 Ibn Mula'ib, ruler of Homs and Apamea, was besieged and captured by Tutush and sent to Malik-Shah as a captive.

The collapse of their emirate deprived the Mirdasids of their leadership over most of the Kilab, the bulk of whom were at this time led by Shibl ibn Jami and dwelt in the southwestern Aleppo plain. The remainder of the tribe was led by Waththab, who entered the service of Tutush. The latter recruited heavily among the Kilab, and the Bedouin in general, in his struggle for supremacy with his Seljuk rival Aq-Sunqur, who ruled in Aleppo. Aq-Sunqur had poor relations with the Kilab, but was obliged to recruit them to bolster his insufficient number of Turkish troops, as the Kilab remained the main pool of military recruitment in northern Syria. When the two sides fought in Hama in May 1093, the Kilabis and Turkmens deserted Aq-Sunqur, who was defeated and executed by Tutush. According to Hugh Kennedy, after the fall of the Mirdasids and the increasing encroachment of their pastures by Turkmen groups, the Kilab "soon disappeared entirely as a Bedouin tribe". Ibn al-Adim notes that clans of the Kilab continued to control remnants of the Mirdasid emirate, albeit unofficially, following the Mirdasids' fall. The Kilab continued to be the strongest and most numerous tribe in northern Syria, but were politically weak as a result of their internal divisions and unwillingness to unite under a supreme emir. Waththab and his Kilabi horsemen made an attempt to block the First Crusade's advance into northern Syria in 1098.

The Ayyubid dynasty conquered Syria toward the end of the 12th century, and the Ayyubid sultan of Egypt, al-Adil, established the office of amir al-arab (commander of the Bedouin) to govern the Bedouin tribes of Syria and incorporate them into the state. The Kilab were excluded from the jurisdiction of the amir al-arab until the Ayyubid ruler of Aleppo, az-Zahir (r. 1186–1210), confiscated their iqta'at in the emirate of Aleppo and passed them over to the Tayy. Az-Zahir's measure prompted some Kilabi clans to migrate northward into Anatolia, while those which remained in northern Syria allied with the Al Fadl, the ruling house of the Tayy and the heritable holders of the amir al-arab post. The Mamluks took over most of the Ayyubid domains in Syria by 1260. In 1262–1263, about 1,000 Kilabi cavalrymen collaborated with the Armenian king in a raid against Mamluk-held Ayn Tab. Later, in 1277, the Kilab gave their allegiance to the Mamluk sultan Baybars at Harim in northern Syria.

=== Internal aspects of the tribe during the emirate period ===
==== Size ====
While the Abu Bakr was the largest Kilabi subtribe in Arabia, the Amr was the largest and strongest in Syria, at least until the 9th century. As a result of their mass migration from Arabia to Syria in 932, the Abu Bakr came to outnumber the Amr in Syria. Most of the Abu Bakr tribesmen hailed from its Awf, Rabi'a and Amr branches. There is scant information about the size of the Kilab at the height of its power in Syria in the 10th and 11th centuries. On two occasions, under Salih in 1014 and under Nasr in 1038, the sources note the Kilab numbered 2,000 horsemen. It is likely that the Kilabi warriors on these two occasions represented only part of the tribe's manpower. In 1075 Ibn al-Adim noted that the Kilab "had never assembled in such great numbers before ... they were about 70,000 horsemen and infantry". Although Zakkar notes that the figure may be exaggerated, he considers that it reflects the "immensity" of the tribe.

The contemporary poets, al-Ma'arri and Ibn Hayyus, do not mention any other tribes in northern Syria except for the Kilab, indicating the tribe's predominance over other Arab nomads in the region. Among the tribes living alongside the Kilab in the emirate were the Banu Abs, based mainly in Wadi Butnan and Hiyar Bani Qa'qa' near Manbij, the Banu Asad in Wadi Butnan, Nuqrat Bani Asad between Khanasir and Hass Mountain, Jabal al-Summaq, and Ma'arrat Misrin, and the Tanukh of Ma'arrat al-Nu'man. The bulk of these tribes had largely abandoned nomadic life for urban living, but retained their tribal traditions and organization.

==== Leadership structure ====
The historian Andrew Cappel notes that the Kilabi clans which entered Syria in the 10th century came with independent leaderships and were not subject to a higher tribal authority. Zakkar writes that the entry of the new Kilabi tribesmen "no doubt had some considerable effect on the life and organization of the whole body of Kilab" in Syria, but "it is very difficult, if not impossible, to find any reliable information concerning this". After their settlement there and the increasing socio-economic stratification among the tribesmen, a new political structure developed, which Cappel calls the "conical clan". The structure was marked by a series of elite households which governed their own clans, and the Kilab as a whole.

Eventually, Salih and his descendants of the Mirdasid house provided the preeminent leadership over the Kilab, with lesser Kilabi chieftains and their descendants presiding over their respective clans. Little is known about the lesser chieftains, except for some of their names. (Note: Among the names of the lesser Kilabi emirs referenced in the sources were Muqallid ibn Za'ida, Husayn ibn Kamil ibn Husayn ibn Sulayman ibn al-Duh and Mansur ibn Muhammad ibn Zughayb.) The succession of the Mirdasid emirs was at times determined internally by primogeniture or the designation of a wali al-ahd (chosen successor, crown prince). Disputes over succession were settled by a consensus among the Kilabi chieftains for the worthiest Mirdasid or, more often, by the outcome of infighting between the Mirdasids and their respective partisans within the Kilab. The emirs' principal claims to loyalty rested on direct kinship ties with a particular clan, or bribery. On occasion lesser Kilabi clans took advantage of divisions within the Mirdasid house for financial gain. Factionalism was intensified due to the near constant rivalry between most of the Kilabi clans, which was only mitigated when the tribe felt compelled to unify in the face of a shared external threat. According to Zakkar, the Kilab "exercised greater authority over the [Mirdasid] dynasty, than the dynasty over [it]".

Although Salih established his Aleppo-based government along the lines of a traditional medieval Islamic state, with a qadi to oversee the judiciary, a fiscal administration, and a vizier to oversee state affairs, the Mirdasid emirate represented a "hybrid of bedouin and sedentary policies and traditions", according to Cappel. Under Salih the center of power shifted from the city to the neighboring Kilabi tribal camps. A new office was established, known as shaykh al-dawla (chieftain of the state), which was reserved for Salih's trusted Kilabi confidant. Each Kilabi chieftain was assigned an iqta by Salih.

==== Culture ====
The way of life of the Kilab in late 10th-century Syria was reminiscent of nomadic life in pre-Islamic Arabia. There were frequent cycles of raids and counter-raids between the Kilabi clans or neighboring tribes, mostly for booty, wantonness or revenge. Initial engagements usually involved combat between a single horseman from either side, while the main body of the tribe spectated. Each opposing horseman would recite a rajaz, boasting of his valor and the merits of his tribe, and challenging any opposing tribesmen to fight. Clashes typically ended with the death of a prominent warrior or leader of a tribe, without the engagement of the main bodies. In many cases, when the Kilab successfully ambushed a rival tribe, they would seize opposing tribesmen and their property; captive tribesmen would be enslaved or released for a heavy ransom.

In springtime, Kilabi youth spent their time horse-racing or drinking wine. Most drinking was done in the many taverns, called hanah in Arabic, located in the tribe's encampments or villages, or along the banks of small streams, called ghadir in Arabic. The Mirdasid emirs held mass feasts for their tribesmen in the spring, on the occasion of lambing season, a circumcision, or a wedding. The local poet Ibn Abi Hasina (d. 1065) mentioned that 50,000 attended a banquet hosted by Thimal for the circumcision of his nephew, Mahmud. The main dish served during the feasts was called madira, which consisted meat cooked in yoghurt mixed with pieces of bread.

Kilabi love poems of the time period resembled those of pre-Islamic Arabia. Love poems could result in a conflict between Kilabi clans or other tribes when one of their women was the subject of the poem. The woman's clan or tribe would initially prohibit her suitor from communicating with her and would force her into marriage with someone else after denying her suitor's permission to marry on account of the poem having dishonored her clan.

According to Zakkar, "Kilabi women, in the main, enjoyed equality with the men and on the whole their life was untrammeled". A number of important personalities of the Mirdasid house were women. Among them was Salih's mother, al-Rabab, who is reported to have given her son reliable political advice and was invited by the Fatimid governor Aziz al-Dawla to live in Aleppo to consecrate his ties with Salih. The Numayrid princess, Alawiyya bint Waththab, who was a wife to Nasr, then Thimal after Nasr's death, and mother to Mahmud, was known in the sources as al-Sayyida (the Lady). In her frequent role as envoy or mediator she was instrumental in establishing Thimal's rule in Aleppo, reconciling Thimal with the Fatimid caliph al-Mustansir in 1050, reconciling the Mirdasids and Numayr in 1061, and saving Mahmud's rule in Aleppo from Alp Arslan's siege in 1071.

The Kilab of Syria, like most Aleppines, were Twelver Shia Muslims. It is not clear to what extent they adhered to the religion. Many of their tribesmen bore names associated with Shia Islam, such as Ali, Ulwan, Hasan and Ja'far, though the vast majority had non-Islamic, Arabic tribal names.

== Al-Andalus ==
Kilabi tribesmen entered al-Andalus (Islamic Spain) as part of the contingent of Jund Qinnasrin in the Syrian army of Balj ibn Bishr al-Qushayri. They were dispatched to suppress the Berber Revolt in North Africa, but were unable to, and afterward crossed to safety into al-Andalus. The Kilabi elements were led by al-Sumayl ibn Hatim, a grandson of Shimr ibn Dhi al-Jawshan, and Ubayd ibn Ali. Al-Sumayl relocated to Cordoba following the establishment of the Umayyad emirate in al-Andalus in 756. He left descendants in his original abode at Jaén. The descendants of Ubayd ibn Ali settled in Cabra and a number of them, including Ali ibn Abi Bakr and the brothers al-Nadr ibn Salama and Muhammad ibn Salama, served as qadis in Cordoba during the emirate period (756–929).

== See also ==
- List of battles of Muhammad

== Bibliography ==
- Amitai-Preiss, Reuven (1995). Mongols and Mamluks: The Mamluk-Ilkhanid War, 1260-1281. Cambridge: Cambridge University Press. ISBN 0-521-46226-6.
- Bianquis, Thierry (1986). Dames et la Syrie sous la domination fatimide (359-468/969-1076): essai d'interprétation de chroniques arabes médiévales, Volume 1 (in French). Institut française de Damas.
- Bianquis, Thierry (1993). "Mirdas". In Bosworth, C. E.; van Donzel, E.; Heinrichs, W. P. & Pellat, Ch. (eds.). The Encyclopaedia of Islam, Second Edition. Volume VII: Mif–Naz. Leiden: E. J. Brill. pp. 115–123. ISBN 978-90-04-09419-2.
- Blankinship, Khalid Yahya, ed. (1993). The History of al-Ṭabarī, Volume XI: The Challenge to the Empires. SUNY Series in Near Eastern Studies. Albany, New York: State University of New York Press. ISBN 978-0-7914-0851-3.
- Bosworth, C. E. (1960). "Buzākha". In Gibb, H. A. R.; Kramers, J. H.; Lévi-Provençal, E.; Schacht, J.; Lewis, B. & Pellat, Ch. (eds.). The Encyclopaedia of Islam, Second Edition. Volume I: A–B. Leiden: E. J. Brill. p. 1358. OCLC 495469456.
- Bosworth, C. E., ed. (1999). The History of al-Ṭabarī, Volume V: The Sāsānids, the Byzantines, the Lakhmids, and Yemen. SUNY Series in Near Eastern Studies. Albany, New York: State University of New York Press. ISBN 978-0-7914-4355-2.
- Brockelmann, C. (1986). "Labīd b. Rabīʿa". In Bosworth, C. E.; van Donzel, E.; Lewis, B. & Pellat, Ch. (eds.). The Encyclopaedia of Islam, Second Edition. Volume V: Khe–Mahi. Leiden: E. J. Brill. pp. 583–584. ISBN 978-90-04-07819-2.
- Cappel, Andrew J. (1994). "The Byzantine Response to the Arab (10th-11th Centuries)". In Dyck, Andrew R.; Takacs, Sarola A. (eds.). Byzantinische Forschungen, Issue 20. Amsterdam: Adolf M. Hakkert. p. 113. ISBN 9789025610722.
- Caskel, W. (1960). "'Amir b. Sa'sa'a". In Gibb, H. A. R.; Kramers, J. H.; Lévi-Provençal, E.; Schacht, J.; Lewis, B. & Pellat, Ch. (eds.). The Encyclopaedia of Islam, Second Edition. Volume I: A–B. Leiden: E. J. Brill. OCLC 495469456.
- Caskel, Werner (1966). Ğamharat an-nasab: Das genealogische Werk des His̆ām ibn Muḥammad al-Kalbī, Volume II (in German). Leiden: Brill.
- Cobb, Paul M. (2001). White Banners: Contention in 'Abbasid Syria, 750–880. SUNY Press. ISBN 978-0-7914-4880-9.
- Crone, Patricia (1980). Slaves on Horses: The Evolution of the Islamic Polity (1980 ed.). Cambridge: Cambridge University Press. ISBN 978-0521229616.
- Daftary, Farhad (2007). The Ismāʿı̄lı̄s: Their History and Doctrines (Second ed.). Cambridge: Cambridge University Press. ISBN 978-0-521-61636-2.
- Dixon, 'Abd al-Ameer 'Abd (August 1969). The Umayyad Caliphate 65–86/684–705: A Political Study (Thesis). University of London, School of Oriental and African Studies.
- Faizer, Rizwi (2011). The Life of Muhammad: Al-Waqidi's Kitab Al-Maghazi. Abingdon, Oxon: Routledge. ISBN 978-0-415-57434-1.
- Elad, Amikam (2016). The Rebellion of Muḥammad al-Nafs al-Zakiyya in 145/762: Ṭālibīs and Early ʿAbbāsīs in Conflict. Leiden: Brill. ISBN 978-90-04-22989-1.
- Fresnel, Fulgence (October 1837). "Letters on the History of the Arabs before Islamism". The Foreign Quarterly Review. 20.
- Fück, J. W. (1965). "Ghaṭafān". In Lewis, B.; Pellat, Ch. & Schacht, J. (eds.). The Encyclopaedia of Islam, Second Edition. Volume II: C–G. Leiden: E. J. Brill. pp. 1023–1024. OCLC 495469475.
- Hiyari, Mustafa A. (1975). "The Origins and Development of the Amīrate of the Arabs during the Seventh/Thirteenth and Eighth/Fourteenth Centuries". Bulletin of the School of Oriental and African Studies. 38 (3): 509–524. doi:10.1017/s0041977x00048060. JSTOR 613705.
- Ibn Abd Rabbihi (2011). The Unique Necklace, Volume III: Al-Iqd al-Farid. Translated by Emeritus Issa J. Boullata. Reading: Garnet Publishing. ISBN 978-1-85964-240-5.
- Howard, I. K. A., ed. (1990). The History of al-Ṭabarī, Volume XIX: The Caliphate of Yazīd ibn Muʿāwiyah, A.D. 680–683/A.H. 60–64. SUNY Series in Near Eastern Studies. Albany, New York: State University of New York Press. ISBN 978-0-7914-0040-1.
- James, David (2012). A History of Early Al-Andalus: The Akhbar Majmu'a. Abingdon, Oxon: Routledge. ISBN 978-0-415-66943-6.
- Kennedy, Hugh (2004) [1986]. The Prophet and the Age of the Caliphates: The Islamic Near East from the 6th to the 11th Century (Second ed.). Harlow: Longman. ISBN 978-0-582-40525-7.
- Khoury, R. G. (2002). "Wakīʿ b. al-Djarrāḥ b Malīḥ". In Bearman, P. J.; Bianquis, Th.; Bosworth, C. E.; van Donzel, E. & Heinrichs, W. P. (eds.). The Encyclopaedia of Islam, Second Edition. Volume XI: W–Z. Leiden: E. J. Brill. p. 101. ISBN 978-90-04-12756-2.
- Kister, M. J. (1965). "The Expedition of Biʾr Maʿūna". In Makdisi, George (ed.). Arabic and Islamic studies in honor of Hamilton A. R. Gibb. Leiden: Brill. pp. 337–357. Archived from the original on 2024-01-29.
- Kister, M. J. (2017) [1999]. "Al-Ḥīra: Some Notes on its Relations with Arabia". In Peters, F. E. (ed.). The Arabs and Arabia on the Eve of Islam. Abingdon, Oxon: Routledge. pp. 109–128. ISBN 978-0-86078-702-0.
- Kraemer, Joel L., ed. (1989). The History of al-Ṭabarī, Volume XXXIV: Incipient Decline: The Caliphates of al-Wāthiq, al-Mutawakkil and al-Muntaṣir, A.D. 841–863/A.H. 227–248. SUNY Series in Near Eastern Studies. Albany, New York: State University of New York Press. ISBN 978-0-88706-874-4.
- Krenkow, F. (1927). The Poems of Ṭufail ibn ʻAuf al-Ghanawī and aṭ-Ṭirimmāḥ ibn Ḥakīm aṭ-Ṭāʼyī. London: Luzac and Co.
- Krenkow, F. (1993) [1927]. "Kilāb b. Rabīʿa". The Encyclopædia of Islam: A Dictionary of the Geography, Ethnography and Biography of the Muhammadan Peoples, Volume IV: ʿItk-Kwaṭṭa (Reprint ed.). Leiden, New York and Koln: Brill. p. 1005. ISBN 9004082654.
- Landau-Tasseron, Ella (1986). "'The Sinful Wars: Religious, Social, and Historical Aspects of the Ḥurūb al-Fijār". Jerusalem Studies in Arabic and Islam. 8: 37–59.
- Lyall, Charles (1913). The Diwans of ʿAbīd ibn al-Abraṣ, of Asad, and ʿĀmir ibn aṭ-Ṭufail, of ʿĀmir ibn Ṣaʿṣaʿah. Leiden: Brill. ISBN 9781616405397.
- Lyall, Charles (1918). The Mufaḍḍalīyāt: An Anthology of Ancient Arabian Odes, Volume 2. Oxford: Clarendon Press.
- Madelung, Wilferd (2000). "Abūʾl ʿAmayṭar the Sufyānī". Jerusalem Studies in Arabic and Islam. 24: 327–343.
- Meyer, Egber (1970). Der historische Gehalt der Aiyām al-'Arab (in German). Wiesbaden: Otto Harrassowitz. ISBN 9783447012706.
- Miller, Nathaniel Ashton (June 2016). Tribal Poetics in Early Arabic Culture: The Case of Ashʿār al-Hudhaliyyīn (Thesis). Chicago: University of Chicago.
- Salibi, Kamal S. (1977). Syria Under Islam: Empire on Trial, 634–1097, Volume 1. Delmar: Caravan Books. ISBN 9780882060132.
- Sezgin, Fuat (1975). Geschichte des arabischen schriftums, Band II, Poesie bis ca. 430H (in German). Leiden: Brill. ISBN 9004043764.
- Hawting, G. R., ed. (1989). The History of al-Ṭabarī, Volume XX: The Collapse of Sufyānid Authority and the Coming of the Marwānids: The Caliphates of Muʿāwiyah II and Marwān I and the Beginning of the Caliphate of ʿAbd al-Malik, A.D. 683–685/A.H. 64–66. SUNY Series in Near Eastern Studies. Albany, New York: State University of New York Press. ISBN 978-0-88706-855-3.
- Powers, David S., ed. (1989). The History of al-Ṭabarī, Volume XXIV: The Empire in Transition: The Caliphates of Sulaymān, ʿUmar, and Yazīd, A.D. 715–724/A.H. 96–105. SUNY Series in Near Eastern Studies. Albany, New York: State University of New York Press. ISBN 978-0-7914-0072-2.
- Rowson, Everett K., ed. (1989). The History of al-Ṭabarī, Volume XXII: The Marwānid Restoration: The Caliphate of ʿAbd al-Malik, A.D. 693–701/A.H. 74–81. SUNY Series in Near Eastern Studies. Albany, New York: State University of New York Press. ISBN 978-0-88706-975-8.
- Shaban, M. A. (1970). The Abbasid Revolution. Cambridge University Press. ISBN 0-521-29534-3.
- Shahid, Irfan (1965). "Ḍarīyya". In Lewis, B.; Pellat, Ch. & Schacht, J. (eds.). The Encyclopaedia of Islam, Second Edition. Volume II: C–G. Leiden: E. J. Brill. OCLC 495469475.
- Shahid, Irfan (2002). Byzantium and the Arabs in the Sixth Century, Part 1. Washington, D.C.: Dumbarton Oaks Research Library and Collection. ISBN 0-88402-284-6.
- Shahid, Irfan (1997). "Shi'b Jabala". In Bosworth, C. E.; van Donzel, E.; Heinrichs, W. P. & Lecomte, G. (eds.). The Encyclopaedia of Islam, Second Edition. Volume IX: San–Sze. Leiden: E. J. Brill. pp. 424–425. ISBN 978-90-04-10422-8.
- Siddiqi, Muhammad Yasin Mazhar (1987). Organisation of Government Under the Prophet. Delhi: Idarah-i Adabiyat-i Delli.
- Spectorsky, Susan A. (2013). "Ahmad b. Hanbal (d. 243/855)". In Powers, David S.; Spectorsky, Susan A.; Arabi, Oussama (eds.). Islamic Legal Thought: A Compendium of Muslim Jurists. Leiden and Boston: Brill. pp. 85–106. ISBN 978-90-04-25452-7.
- Stetkevych, Suzanne Pinckney (2010). The Mute Immortals Speak: Pre-Islamic Poetry and the Poetics of Ritual. Ithaca and London: Cornell University Press. ISBN 9780801480461.
- Taha, Abdulwahid Dhanun (2016) [1989]. The Muslim Conquest and Settlement of North Africa and Spain. Abingdon, Oxon: Routledge. ISBN 978-1-138-68963-3.
- Watt, W. Montgomery (1971). "Hawāzin". In Lewis, B.; Ménage, V. L.; Pellat, Ch. & Schacht, J. (eds.). The Encyclopaedia of Islam, Second Edition. Volume III: H–Iram. Leiden: E. J. Brill. pp. 285–286. OCLC 495469525.
- Watt, W. Montgomery (1986). "Kilāb b. Rabīʿa". In Bosworth, C. E.; van Donzel, E.; Lewis, B. & Pellat, Ch. (eds.). The Encyclopaedia of Islam, Second Edition. Volume V: Khe–Mahi. Leiden: E. J. Brill. p. 101. ISBN 978-90-04-07819-2.
- Wellhausen, Julius (1889). Medina vor dem Islam (in German). Berlin: Georg Reimer. ISBN 9780837077543.
- Williams, John Alden, ed. (1985). The History of al-Ṭabarī, Volume XXVII: The ʿAbbāsid Revolution, A.D. 743–750/A.H. 126–132. SUNY Series in Near Eastern Studies. Albany, New York: State University of New York Press. ISBN 978-0-87395-884-4.
- Zakkar, Suhayl (1969). The Emirate of Aleppo 392/1002–487/1094 (PDF) (PhD). London: University of London.
- Zakkar, Suhayl (1971). The Emirate of Aleppo: 1004–1094. Aleppo: Dar al-Amanah.
