= Darder =

Darder is a surname. Notable people with the surname include:

- Antonia Darder (born 1952), Puerto Rican academic, artist, poet, and activist
- Sergi Darder (born 1993), Spanish footballer

== See also ==
- Harder (surname)
