= Harder (surname) =

Harder is a surname. Notable people with the surname include:

- Agnes Harder (1864–1939), German teacher, nationalistic writer and Nazi propagandist
- Bobbie Harder, American 21st century politician
- Christopher Harder (born 1948), Canadian lawyer in New Zealand
- Conrad Harder (born 2005), Danish footballer
- Fred Harder (1892–1956), American racing driver
- Elaine Harder (1947–2013), American politician
- Emil Harder (1883 – after 1925), Swiss film producer
- Friedrich Harder (1891–1944), German SS-Hauptscharführer in Auschwitz concentration camp
- George Harder (born 1974), Samoan former rugby union footballer
- Grace Harder (born 2004), American trampoliner
- Günter Harder (1938–2025), German mathematician
- Hans Harder (1792–1873), Danish painter and drawing master
- Hauke Harder (born 1963), German composer and experimental physicist
- Heinrich Harder (1858–1935), German artist and art professor
- Hieronymus Harder (1523–1607), German botanist and teacher of Latin
- James Harder (ufologist) (1926–2006), American professor of civil and hydraulic engineering, and ufologist
- Jan Harder (born 1951), Canadian politician
- Joe Harder (1916–2004), American politician
- Josh Harder (born 1986), American politician
- Jürgen Harder (1918–1945), German fighter pilot
- Kelsie B. Harder (1922–2007), American professor and linguist
- Knud Harder (1885–1967), Danish composer, organist and conductor
- Lutz-Michael Harder (1942–2019), German opera tenor and voice teacher
- Mel Harder (1909–2002), American Major League Baseball pitcher, coach and manager
- Olli Harder, New Zealand association football coach and former player
- Otto Harder (1892–1956), German footballer and convicted war criminal
- Pat Harder (1922–1992), American football player and official
- Pernille Harder (born 1992), Danish footballer
- Pernille Harder (badminton) (born 1977), Danish former badminton player
- Peter Harder (academic) (born 1950), Danish linguist and professor of English
- Peter Harder (politician) (born 1952), Canadian senator and former civil servant
- Rachael Thomas (born 1986), née Harder, Canadian politician
- Rhea Harder (born 1976), German actress
- Robert Harder (1929–2014), American politician
- Spud Harder (1906–1994), American college football player, college football and baseball coach and college athletic director
- Tammo Harder (born 1994), German footballer
- Theo Härder (born 1945), German computer scientist and professor
- Vince Harder (born 1982), New Zealand R&B/pop singer and producer

== See also ==
- Bertus de Harder (1920–1982), Dutch footballer
- Haeder, surname
- Hader (disambiguation)#People with the surname
- Harders, surname
