= Hadar, Iran =

Hadar (Persian: هدر or هادار) in Iran may refer to:

- Hadar, Khoy (هدر - Ḩadar), West Azerbaijan Province
- Hadar, Salmas (هدر - Ḩadar), West Azerbaijan Province

== See also ==
- Hadar (disambiguation)
