= Dharabi Dam =

Dam in Pakistan

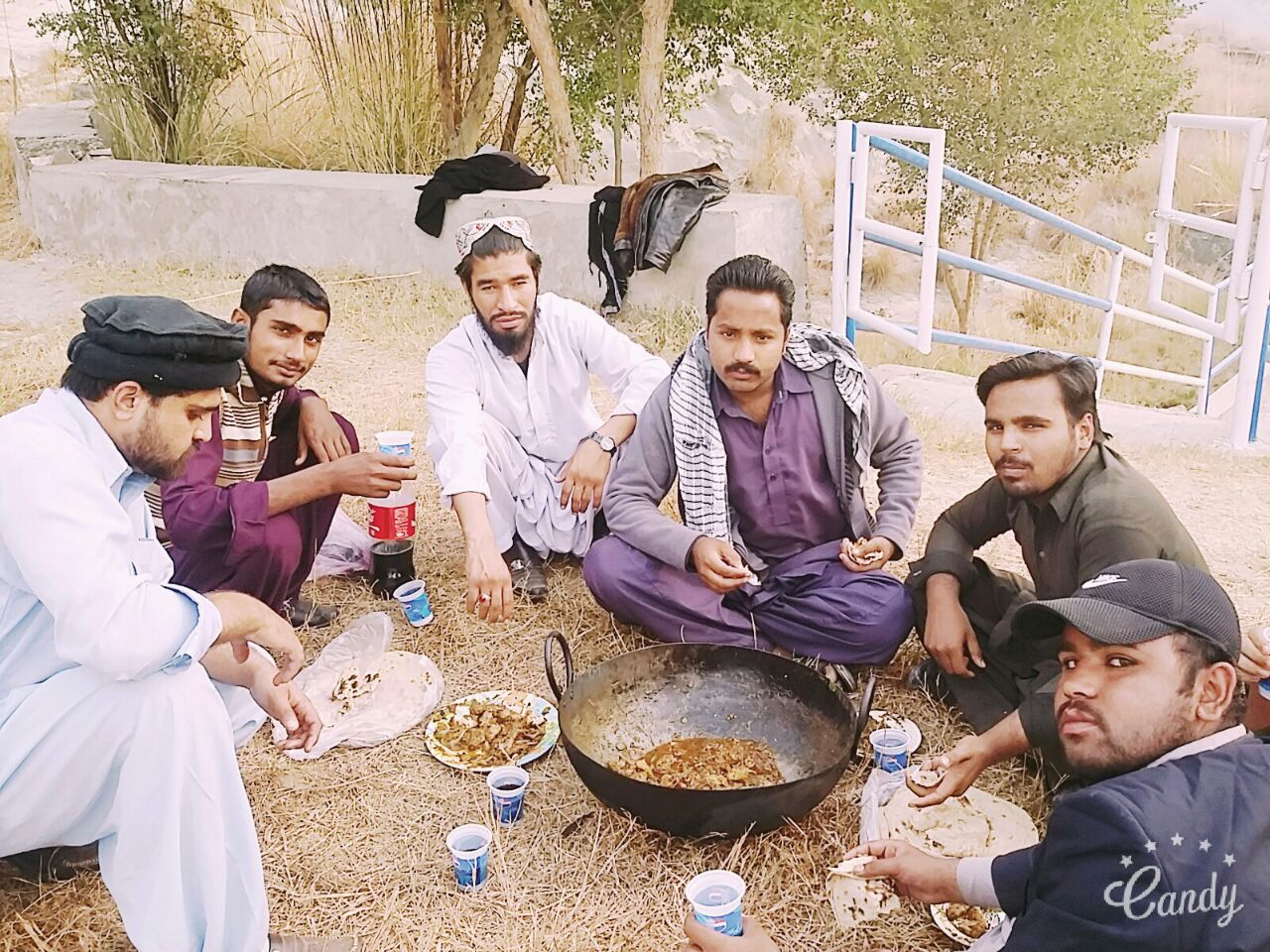
Local tourists enjoying a picnic at Dharabi Dam

Dharabi Dam is located in Punjab, Pakistan. It was built to impound the Dharab River, to help farmers grow crops and facilitate recreational activities like boating.

== See also ==
List of dams and reservoirs in Pakistan
