= Ibn Hayyus =

- ابن حيوس
- Born: Al-Amir Muṣṭafa ad-Dawla Abī al-Fityān Muhammad; December 1003; Damascus, Syria
- Died: January/February 1081; Aleppo, Syria
- Occupation: Poet
- Writing career
- Language: Arabic
- Period: Medieval
- Genre: Panegyric
- Notable work: Panegyrics to the Mirdasids of Aleppo

Al-Amir Muṣṭafa ad-Dawla Abī al-Fityān Muhammad, (Note: Full name and genealogy: Al-Amir Muṣṭafa ad-Dawla Abī al-Fityān Mûḥammad ibn Sultân ibn Mûḥammad ibn Hayyûs ibn Mûḥammad ibn al-Murtada ibn Mûḥammad ibn al-Haytham ibn Uthmân al-Ghanawī) better known as Ibn Ḥayyûs (Arabic: ابن حيوس) (December 1003 – January/February 1081), was an Arab poet from Syria. He was well known for writing panegyrics to the emirs and nobility of Syria, particularly the Mirdasids of Aleppo.

== Biography ==
Ibn Hayyus was born in Damascus in December 1003. He received his name from his grandfather, Hayyus. Ibn Hayyus was styled al-amir (prince/commander) because his father, Sultan, was a commander of the Bedouin. The family descended from the Banu Ghani, a Qaysi tribe. Ibn Hayyus's home was located in the Zuqaq-Attaf neighborhood of Damascus. In 1016, the Fatimid officer, Anushtakin al-Dizbari, resided in the family's home for roughly a year; Ibn Hayyus later dedicated numerous panegyrics to Anushtakin, who had become governor of Fatimid Syria in 1029.

In the course of his writing career, Ibn Hayyus became acquainted with several local rulers, Fatimid officials and other dignitaries. He dedicated to them panegyrics and in turn, was rewarded by them with riches. In the process, he gained the surname "Mustafa ad-Dawla" (the chosen of the state). He became particularly associated with the Mirdasid emirs of Aleppo, where he moved in 1072. One of the Mirdasid emirs, Mahmud ibn Nasr, once rewarded him with one thousand gold dinars. Following Mahmud's death in 1075, Ibn Hayyus developed a close friendship with his son, Nasr ibn Mahmud. In one of his poems, Ibn Hayyus wrote "Mahmud gave me one thousand pieces of gold out of his treasury; I know for certainty his son Nasr will do the same." Nasr was honored by the elegy and exclaimed "if he [Ibn Hayyus] had said Nasr would double the sum several times over, I should certainly have done it!"

The wealth Ibn Hayyus accrued from the Mirdasids of Aleppo enabled to build a residence for himself in the city. On a panel atop the house's doorway, he inscribed the following ode:

We built this abode and in it we resided, enjoying the bounty of the Mirdasids, a family which delivered us from adversity and the tyranny of fortune. Say to the sons of Earth: 'Let men act thus towards their fellow-men'.

In 1079, the Uqaylid emir of Upper Mesopotamia, Muslim ibn Quraysh, granted Ibn Hayyus an iqtaʿ (fief) in Mosul in gratitude for an elegy Ibn Hayyus wrote for him. Ibn Hayyus died in his home in 1081.

== Bibliography ==
- Ibn Khallikan (1868). De Slane, Mac Guckin (ed.). Ibn Khallikan's Biographical Dictionary, Volume 3. Paris: Oriental Translation Fund of Great Britain and Ireland.
