= Harders =

Harders is a surname. Notable people with the surname include:

- Clarrie Harders (1915–1997), Australian public servant
- Jake Harders (born 1976), English actor
- Jane Harders (fl. 1969–2020), Australian actress

== See also ==
- Harder (surname)
