= Muslim ibn Quraysh =

10th-century Muslim ruler of northern Syria

Sharaf al-Dawla شرف الدولة
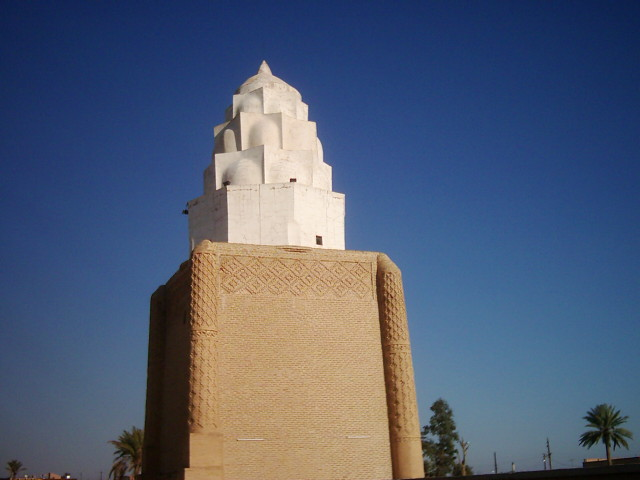
- The Imam Dur Mausoleum which contains the purported tomb of Muslim ibn Quraysh

Uqaylid Sultan
- Reign: 1061–1085
- Predecessor: Alam al-Din
- Successor: Ibrahim ibn Quraysh
- Died: 1085; Samarra, Iraq
- Burial: Imam Dur Mausoleum (disputed)
- Spouse: Safiya Khatun
- Issue: Ali ibn Muslim
Names
- Muslim ibn Quraysh ibn Badran
- Tribe: Banu Uqayl
- Dynasty: Uqaylid Dynasty
- Father: Quraysh ibn Badran
- Religion: Shia Islam

Abu'l-Makarim Muslim ibn Quraysh (Arabic: أبو المكارم مسلم بن قريش) also known by the honorific title Sharaf al-Dawla (شرف الدولة), was a sultan of the Uqaylid Emirate during whose reign it reached its peak. He was the last Arab ruler whose dominion included parts of modern-day Turkey. He died in June 1085.

== History ==
Muslim's father Quraysh bin Badran, who was known by his honorific title Alam al-Din, was the Arab emir of Mosul who acknowledged the supremacy of the Seljuks, although he later came into conflict with them and was temporarily expelled from Mosul. He accompanied the Mamluk soldier Basasiri when the latter took Baghdad at the end of 1058, but the Seljuks retook the city in the next year. Quraysh died in 1061, and was followed by his son, Muslim ibn Quraysh.

As Muslim was a Shiite, he initially recognised the Caliph of Cairo but due to the growing power of the Seljuks accepted an alliance with Alp Arslan around the year 1066. His ties to the Seljuks were strengthened by a marriage to Safiyya, who was an aunt to the later Sultan Malik-Shah, but he seems to have explored anyways an alliance with the Fatimids.

In 1077, he joined as Malik-Shah's vassal the sultan's brother emir Tutush I campaign to capture Aleppo during the reign of Sabiq ibn Mahmud of the Mirdasids. However, Muslim was personally fond of Sabiq, opposed a Seljuk takeover of Aleppo, and admonished the Kilabi chiefs for inviting Turkoman foreigners against their kinsman. Moreover, he persuaded the Kilab to defect from Tutush's army and had Waththab and Shabib reconcile with and join their brother Sabiq in Aleppo. Muslim informed Tutush that he was withdrawing from the siege, but before departing he entered Aleppo through Bab al-Iraq where he allowed his troops to sell the residents of Aleppo food and supplies. Tutush maintained the siege and had called for reinforcements from Malik Shah I before Muslim's withdrawal. On his way back to Mosul, Muslim encountered the 1,000 Seljuk reinforcements at Sinjar. After failing to persuade them to turn back, he sent Sabiq warnings of their presence. Sabiq sent for help from the Kilabi chief Abu Za'ida Muhammad ibn Za'ida who led a coalition of Arab tribesmen to ambush and rout the Seljuk reinforcements at Wadi Butnan, slaying most of them. This prompted Tutush to leave Aleppo.

In 1080, Tutush influenced Sabiq to cede the emirate to Muslim ibn Quraysh, in which its inhabitants had hopes that he could protect them from Seljuk raids. He also took Harran from the Numayrids in the following year. Soon, however, he ran into trouble with the Seljuks himself. He fought against Sultan Malik Shah I's forces and was defeated, but he was pardoned. After Suleiman ibn Qutalmish had taken over Antioch in December 1084, Muslim demanded the tribute the Philaretos Brachamios used to pay him but Suleiman refused this on grounds of being a Muslim himself. In June 1085, he was killed fighting the Seljuks of Suleiman ibn Qutalmish after his Turkoman mercenaries deserted him and sided with Suleiman and his Arab forces fled.

Following Sharaf al-Dawla's death, his brother Ibrahim ibn Quraysh, who had previously been imprisoned, was released and declared as his successor. Ibrahim would eventually be succeeded by his nephew, Ali ibn Muslim.

== Legacy ==
Muslim ibn Quraysh was regarded as the last strong Arab king in northern Mesopotamia, whose death resulted in the almost entire obliteration of the Arab Bedouins’ rule and the dominance of the Turcoman nomads.

== Tomb ==
The alleged tomb of Muslim ibn Quraysh was the Imam Dur Mausoleum in Samarra. However, the identity of the entombed is disputed. An inscription on the exterior states that the mausoleum is built in honour of Imam Muhammad al-Durri, an alleged son of the seventh Shia Imam, Musa al-Kadhim.

== Bibliography ==
- Bianquis, Thierry (1993). "Mirdās, Banū or Mirdāsids". In Bosworth, C. E.; van Donzel, E.; Heinrichs, W. P. & Pellat, Ch. (eds.). The Encyclopaedia of Islam, Second Edition. Volume VII: Mif–Naz. Leiden: E. J. Brill. pp. 115–123. ISBN 978-90-04-09419-2.
- Bosworth, C. E. (2000). "ʿUḳaylids". In Bearman, P. J.; Bianquis, Th.; Bosworth, C. E.; van Donzel, E. & Heinrichs, W. P. (eds.). The Encyclopaedia of Islam, Second Edition. Volume X: T–U. Leiden: E. J. Brill. pp. 786–787. doi:10.1163/1573-3912_islam_COM_1274. ISBN 978-90-04-11211-7.
- Fierro, Maribel (2010). The New Cambridge History of Islam: Volume 2, The Western Islamic World, Eleventh to Eighteenth Centuries. Cambridge University Press. ISBN 978-1316184332.
- Grabar, Oleg (1985). An Annual on Islamic Art and Architecture. Brill. ISBN 9004076115.
- Richards, Donald Sydney (2002). The Annals of the Saljuq Turks: Selections from Al-Kāmil Fīʻl-Taʻrīkh of ʻIzz Al-Dīn Ibn Al-Athīr. Psychology Press. ISBN 0700715762.
- Sobernheim, M. (1993). "Muslim b. Ḳurays̲h̲". In Bosworth, C. E.; van Donzel, E.; Heinrichs, W. P. & Pellat, Ch. (eds.). The Encyclopaedia of Islam, Second Edition. Volume VII: Mif–Naz. Leiden: E. J. Brill. pp. 692–693. doi:10.1163/1573-3912_islam_SIM_5598. ISBN 978-90-04-09419-2.
- Yusuf, Muhsin D. (2021). Economic Survey of Syria during the Tenth and Eleventh Centuries. Walter de Gruyter GmbH & Co KG. ISBN 978-3112400784.
- Zakkar, Suheil (1969). The Emirate of Aleppo 392/1002–487/1094 (PDF) (PhD). London: University of London.
