= Hader =

Hader may refer to:

== Places ==
- Hađer, Croatia
- Hader, Minnesota, United States
- Al-Hader, Syria
- Hader, Quneitra Governorate, Syria

== People with the surname ==
- Berta and Elmer Hader, American couple who illustrated and wrote children's books
- Bill Hader (born 1978), American actor, voice actor, comedian, producer and writer
- Denise Crosswhite Hader (born 1965), American politician
- Josef Hader (born 1962), Austrian comedian, actor, and writer
- Josh Hader (born 1994), American professional baseball pitcher

== Other uses ==
- Hader Clinic, Melbourne, Australia; a residential treatment centre

== See also ==
- Haeder, surname
- Hadar (disambiguation)
