= Imam Dur Mausoleum =

Historic former mausoleum in Samarra, Iraq

- قبة الإمام محمد الدري
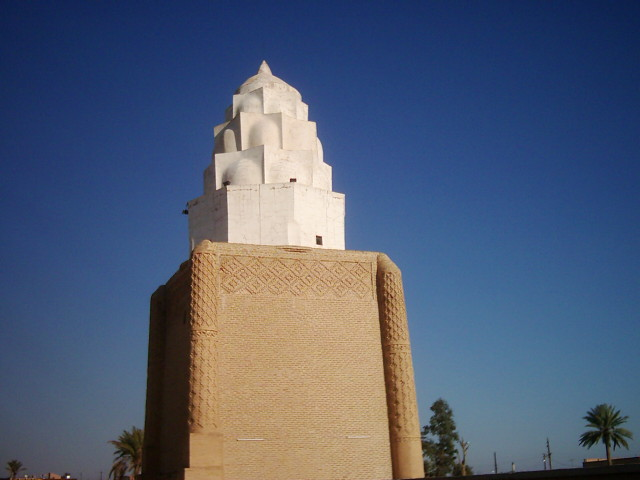
- The former mausoleum in 2005, prior to its 2014 destruction

Religion
- Affiliation: Sunni Islam (former)
- Ecclesiastical or organisational status: Mausoleum (1085–2014)
- Status: Destroyed

Location
- Location: Samarra, Saladin Governorate
- Country: Iraq

Architecture
- Architect: Abu Shakir ibn Abi al-Faraj
- Type: Islamic architecture
- Style: Abbasid
- Founder: Abu Jafar Muhammad
- Completed: c. 1085 CE
- Destroyed: 23 October 2014 (by ISIL)

Specifications
- Dome: One
- Shrines: One: disputed; Muslim ibn Quraysh, or; Abu 'Abd-Allah Muhammad Al-Durri ibn Musa Al-Kadhim (and son)
- Materials: Baked bricks

The Imam Dur Mausoleum (Arabic: قبة الإمام محمد الدُّرِّي, romanized: Qubbat al-Imam Muḥammad Al-Durri) was a Sunni mausoleum located 20 kilometres (12 mi) north of Samarra, in the Saladin Governorate of Iraq. Completed in c. 1085 CE, during the Uqaylid era, the mausoleum was destroyed by the Islamic State of Iraq and the Levant on 23 October 2014.

== History ==
The mausoleum dates from the 11th century, and was first administered by the Seljuk court, which was mainly a Sunni institution. The architect of the mausoleum was Abu Shakir ibn Abi al-Faraj. The building was among the many works that the chamberlain, Abu Jafar Muhammad, ordered to be completed. The construction of the mausoleum was eventually completed before 1094 CE. The mausoleum was the earliest datable example of a building that used a muqarnas dome. The legal caretaker, or mutawalli, of the mausoleum was Qadi Mu'nis ibn Hamdan, who was succeeded in this role by Hasan ibn Rafi.

At some point of time, a mosque was built next to the mausoleum, but only the mausoleum was present in photographs by travelers in the 20th century.

== Architecture ==
The site of the Imam Dur Mausoleum is a walled enclosure. The mausoleum building is a cube-shaped structure topped with a muqarnas dome. The base of the muqarnas dome was a tall cube bolstered by pillars, one in each corner, that were made of baked brick. Banna'i brickwork adorned each pillar and a band at the top of the base. Surmounting the cube was the muqarnas dome resting on a tall, octagonal drum. The shell of the dome consisted of three increasingly narrower octagonal drums, each rotated slightly to form a spiral effect. At the top of each drum was a dome-shaped cupola.

The tomb chamber is entered through a door on the north side of the building. Inside, it features stucco ornamentation, which includes rows of blind lobed arches. The inner part of the muqarnas dome's highest cupola is decorated with fluting.

=== Shrine identity ===
The identity of the entombed person is disputed. An inscription on the exterior of the mausoleum states that the building is a turba, or tomb, of Abu 'Abd-Allah Muhammad Al-Durri, a senior scholar of Ad-Dawr and the son of the seventh Shia Imam, Musa Al-Kadhim. He was buried in 838 CE. Another inscription states that the entombed is the Uqaylid amir, Sharaf al-Dawla Muslim ibn Quraysh who died in 1085 CE.

== 2014 demolition ==
The Imam Dur Mausoleum was detonated by the Islamic State of Iraq and the Levant on 23 October 2014.

== See also ==
- Destruction of cultural heritage by the Islamic State
- Islam in Iraq
- List of mosques in Iraq
