= Expedition of Dahhak al-Kilabi =

The Expedition of Dahhak al-Kilabi against the Banu Kilab tribe in the Najd region of what is now Saudi Arabia took place in August 630 AD, 9AH, 2nd month of the Islamic Calendar, with the goal of converting its members to Islam. Due to a refusal to convert, fighting broke out, and the Banu Kilab fled. A member of the expedition, Al-Asyad, then captured his father, a member of Banu Kilab, and held him until he could get support from another Muslim, who then killed his father.

== Expedition ==
Muhammad sent al-Dahak ibn Sufyan to al-Zuji to invite the people of Banu Kilab to embrace Islam. They refused. The Muslims then attacked the people of Banu Kilab, who then fled.

Among the fighters on the Muslim side was a man named al-Asyad. He met his father, Salamah, and called him to embrace Islam. However, his father verbally abused Islam. Al-Asyad then hamstrung his father's horse. When he fell to the ground, he grabbed hold of him until he could get support from another Muslim, who then killed his father. All other tribesmen of the Banu Kilab fled the scene after brief fighting.

== Islamic primary sources ==
The event is also mentioned by the Muslim Scholar Ibn Sa'd in his book "Kitab al-tabaqat al-kabir", as follows:

THE SARIYYAH OF AL-DAHHAK IBN SUFYAN AL- KILABI AGAINST BANU KILAB.

Then (occurred) the sariyyah of al-Dahhak Ibn Sufyan al-Kilabi...

They (the narrators) said: The Apostle of Allah sent a force under al-Dahhak Ibn Sufyan Ibn ‘Awf Ibn Abu Bakr al-Kilabi, against al-Qurara. Al-Asyad Ibn Salamah Ibn Qart was with him. They encountered them at al-Zujj, the Zujj of Lawah and invited them to embrace Islam. They refused, so they attacked them and forced them to flee. Then al-Asyad met his father Salamah who was on his own horse, in a pond of al-Zujj. He invited his father to embrace Islam promising him amnesty. He (father) abused him and his creed. Consequently al-Asyad hamstrung the horse of his father. When the horse fell on his hoofs Salamah reclined on his spear in water. He (al-Asyad) held him till one of them (Muslims) came there and killed him. His son did not kill him.

[Kitab al-tabaqat al-kabir, By Ibn Sa'd, Volume 2, Pg 201]

== See also ==
- Military career of Muhammad
- List of expeditions of Muhammad
