= Hadar =

Hadar may refer to:

== Nature ==
- Hadar (star), also known as Beta Centauri, a star in the constellation of Centaurus

== People ==
- Hadar (name)

== Places ==
- Hadar, Ethiopia
- Al-Hadar, Hatra, Nineveh, Iraq
- Hadar HaCarmel, Haifa, Israel
- Hadar, Hod HaSharon, Israel
- Tell Hadar, an archaeological site on the eastern coast of the Sea of Galilee
- Hadar, Iran (disambiguation)
- Hadar, Nebraska, US
- Hader, Quneitra Governorate, Syria; also spelt Hadar

== Other uses ==
- Hadar (educational institution), a Jewish egalitarian educational institution based in New York City

== See also ==
- Hadad (Bible), several biblical characters, also known as Hadar
- Hader (disambiguation)
