= Hadar (name) =

Hadar is a name which is used as given name and surname. People with the name include:

== Given name ==
- Hadar Cars (born 1933), Swedish politician
- Hadar Rubinstein (born 1967), Israeli Olympic swimmer

== Surname ==
- Leon Hadar, global affairs analyst, journalist, blogger and author
- Zvika Hadar (born 1966), Israeli actor, comedian, and television host

== See also ==
- Hadar (disambiguation)
