= Haeder =

Haeder is a surname. Notable people with the name include:

- Josh Haeder (born 1980), American politician
- Matthias Haeder (born 1989), German footballer

== See also ==
- Hader (disambiguation)#People with the surname
