= Hadar, Khoy =

Hadar هدر
- Village
- Location within Iran
- Coordinates: 38°50′26″N 44°40′30″E
- Country: Iran
- Province: West Azerbaijan
- County: Khoy
- Bakhsh: Safayyeh
- Rural District: Sokmanabad

Population (2006)
  - Total: 223
- Time zone: UTC+3:30 (IRST)
  - Summer (DST): UTC+4:30 (IRDT)

Hadar (Persian: هدر, also Romanized as Ḩadar) is a village in Sokmanabad Rural District, Safayyeh District, Khoy County, West Azerbaijan Province, Iran. At the 2006 census, its population was 223, in 34 families.
