= Nasr ibn Mahmud =

Emir of Aleppo from 1075 to 1076

Emir of Aleppo
- Reign: 1075 – 8 May 1076
- Predecessor: Mahmud ibn Nasr
- Successor: Sabiq ibn Mahmud
- Died: 8 May 1076; Al-Hadir, Emirate of Aleppo
Names
- Naṣr ibn Maḥmūd ibn Naṣr ibn Ṣāliḥ ibn Mirdās
- Tribe: Banu Kilab
- Dynasty: Mirdasid
- Father: Mahmud ibn Nasr
- Mother: Daughter of Jalal al-Dawla

Nasr ibn Mahmud ibn Nasr ibn Salih ibn Mirdas (Arabic: نصر بن محمود بن نصر المرداسي, romanized: Naṣr ibn Maḥmūd ibn Naṣr ibn Ṣaliḥ ibn Mirdās) (died 1076) was the Mirdasid emir of Aleppo in 1075–1076.

== Family ==
Nasr was the eldest son of Mahmud ibn Nasr, the Mirdasid emir of Aleppo (r. 1065–1075). Nasr's mother was a daughter of the Buyid emir Jalal al-Dawla. His brothers, from a different mother(s), were Sabiq, Waththab and Shabib and sister Mani'a.

== Rule ==
Mahmud designated his youngest son Shabib as his successor, but upon Mahmud's death in early 1075, Nasr was recognized as Aleppo's emir. Shabib was still young and the leading officials of the emirate, as well as its troops, favored Nasr. As soon as he took office he executed his father's vizier, the commander Ali ibn Abi al-Thurayya, having accused him of influencing Mahmud's nomination of Shabib. In his place, Nasr appointed Abu Nasr Muhammad ibn al-Hasan al-Tamimi, known as Ibn al-Nahhas. Nasr entrusted his foster-uncle, the Banu Munqidh emir Sadid al-Mulk Ali ibn Muqallid, to oversee most of his leadership duties. Sadid al-Mulk and Ibn al-Nahhas shared an interest in literature and developed a strong working relationship. According to the historian Thierry Bianquis, Nasr "showed himself to be more peaceful and more generous than his father".

He enjoyed the support of the Turkmen forces based in Aleppo, who were commanded by a certain Ahmad Shah. The latter besieged and captured Manbij from the Byzantines in September/October 1075. Not long after, Aleppo's southern countryside was raided by the Seljuk ruler of Damascus, Atsiz, and his brother Jawli. During the assault, they captured Rafaniyya. After Nasr's attempt to pay Atsiz to withdraw was rebuffed, he dispatched Ahmad Shah against him. Ahmad Shah fought the Seljuks in two engagements and drove them out, restoring Mirdasid control over Rafaniyya.

== Death and aftermath ==
On 8 May 1075, the day of Eid al-Fitr, Nasr became intoxicated and imprisoned Ahmad Shah for an unclear reason. He proceeded to attack Ahmad's Turkmen troops in their base at al-Hadir, on the outskirts of Aleppo. During the fighting, Nasr was killed by a Turkmen archer's arrow. The Aleppines subsequently closed the city's gates to prevent the advancing Turkmens from attempting to free their chief, while Sadid al-Mulk and Ibn al-Nahhas maintained order in the city and its citadel. Sadid al-Mulk arranged for Sabiq to succeed Nasr. Sabiq released Ahmad Shah, who thereafter wielded significant influence over him and together with the Turkmens dominated the emirate at the expense of the Mirdasids' tribe, the Banu Kilab. The tribe nominated Waththab as their emir and helped drive out Sadid al-Mulk from Aleppo to his family's base in Kafartab.

== Bibliography ==
- Bianquis, Thierry (1993). "Mirdās, Banū or Mirdāsids". In Bosworth, C. E.; van Donzel, E.; Heinrichs, W. P. & Pellat, Ch. (eds.). The Encyclopaedia of Islam, Second Edition. Volume VII: Mif–Naz. Leiden: E. J. Brill. pp. 115–123. doi:10.1163/1573-3912_islam_SIM_5220. ISBN 978-90-04-09419-2.
- Zakkar, Suheil (1969). The Emirate of Aleppo 392/1002–487/1094 (PDF) (PhD thesis). London: University of London.

Preceded by Rashid al-Dawla Mahmud	Emir of Aleppo; 1075–8 May 1076	Succeeded by Sabiq ibn Mahmud
