= Dhahab River =

River in Syria

Coordinates: 36°21′50″N 37°31′9″E

Dhahab River or Dhahab Valley (Arabic: نهر الذهب or وادي الذهب Gold River or Gold Valley), also in medieval times known as Wadi Butnan (Arabic: وادي بطنان, romanized: Wadī Buṭnān) or Butnan Habib, is an intermittent river and valley in northern Syria. The principal towns in the valley are al-Bab, Bizaah and Tadef.

The river is located on the Aleppo plateau in the eastern part of Aleppo Governorate, 30 km east of Aleppo. It drains the heights north of al-Bab and runs from north to south for about 50 km before terminating at Sabkhat al-Jabbul.

== History ==
During the early Muslim period the Arabic sources referred to the valley as Wadi Butnan (the lowland valley) or Butnan Habib (the lowlands of Habib), after the Muslim commander Habib ibn Maslama al-Fihri, who conquered the area during the early Muslim conquests (630s–640s). The region, located about 30 kilometres (19 mi) east of Aleppo, was part of Jund Qinnasrin (the military district of northern Syria).

The Umayyad caliph Abd al-Malik camped in the valley in the winter of 689–690 in preparation of a confrontation with Mus'ab ibn al-Zubayr of Iraq. In 901, it was sacked by the Qarmatians. In 966, it was ravaged by Nikephoros II Phokas. Later on, Kilabi chief Abu Za'ida led a tribal coalition in the region which defeated Seljuk reinforcements to Tutush I who was besieging Aleppo during the reign of Sabiq ibn Mahmud of the Mirdasid dynasty in 1080. However, Seljuk revenge led to the extermination of the Ismaili community. In 1098, it was attacked by the Armenians in the region during the events of the First Crusade. The lord of Tell Bashir, Jocelin, devastated the region in 1125. In 1138, it was occupied by the Byzantine emperor John II Komnenos. It was later captured by Nur ad-Din of the Zengid dynasty.

== Dams ==
Two dams have been constructed on the river, the ʼUm-Julūd Dam and Shabāʼ Dam. Recently water from the Euphrates is being diverted to the river to enhance irrigation in the valley.

== Bibliography ==
- Bianquis, Thierry (2012). "Mirdās, Banū or Mirdāsids". In Bosworth, C. E.; van Donzel, E.; Heinrichs, W. P. & Pellat, Ch. (eds.). The Encyclopaedia of Islam, Second Edition. Volume VII: Mif–Naz. Leiden: E. J. Brill. pp. 115–123. doi:10.1163/1573-3912_islam_SIM_5220. ISBN 978-90-04-09419-2.
- Fattori, Niccolò (June 2013). "The Policies of Nikephoros II Phokas in the context of the Byzantine economic recovery" (PDF). Middle East Technical University.
- Fishbein, Michael, ed. (1990). The History of al-Ṭabarī, Volume XXI: The Victory of the Marwānids, A.D. 685–693/A.H. 66–73. SUNY Series in Near Eastern Studies. Albany, New York: State University of New York Press. ISBN 978-0-7914-0221-4.
- Zakkar, Suheil (1969). The Emirate of Aleppo 392/1002–487/1094 (PDF) (PhD). London: University of London.
