= Rashid al-Dawla Mahmud =

Abu Salama Mahmud ibn Nasr ibn Salih Arabic: محمود بن نصر بن صالح المرداسي, romanized: Abū Salama Maḥmūd ibn Naṣr ibn Ṣāliḥ, also known by his laqab (honorific epithet) Rashid al-Dawla, was the Mirdasid emir of Aleppo from 1060 to 1061 and again from 1065 until his death. He was the son of Shibl al-Dawla Nasr and the Numayrid princess, Mani'a al-Sayyida al-Alawiyya.

== First reign ==
He rose to power as a young prince when the Kilab tribe entrusted him and his cousin, Mani, to regain possession of Aleppo after it was given to the Fatimids by his uncle, Thimal. Their first attempt proved unsuccessful; however, in 1060 they succeeded, after defeating the Fatimids in the Battle of al-Funaydiq. In 1061, Mahmud's first reign came to an end when Thimal was given Aleppo, in an agreement imposed by the Kilab shaykhs.

== Second reign ==
After Thimal's death in late 1062, Mahmud opposed Thimal's nomination of Atiyya (Thimal's brother) as his successor. Clashes followed between Mahmud and his uncle; Atiyya decided to call 1,000 Turcoman archers from Diyarbakır to aid him—the first free Turks to enter Syria. Mahmud was forced into a truce. After Atiyya's supporters pillaged the Turcoman camp, their chief, Ibn Khan, decided to serve Mahmud—which proved decisive. After a victory at Marj Dabiq, Mahmud was able to take possession of Aleppo, in August 1065, following a three-month siege. The Kilab principality was then divided between Mahmud and his uncle into western (including Aleppo) and eastern (including Raqqa) domains, respectively. In 1070 Mahmud appealed to Alp Arslan, the Seljuk Sultan, to control the Turcomans who were constantly increasing in number and were creating disorder in and around Aleppo. To gain Alp Arslan's support Mahmud abandoned the Shia adhan and pro-Fatimid khutbah and switched his allegiance from Shia to Sunni Islam and to the Abbasid caliph and Alp Arslan. After pledging allegiance to him, Mahmud was entrusted by Alp Arslan to drive the Fatimids out of central Syria—the first step in Alp Arslan's plan of destroying the Isma'ili state.

In May 1071 Mahmud conquered Baalbek. According to Ibn al-Adim, a 13th-century Arab biographer and historian, the Byzantine emperor Romanos IV Diogenes blamed the raids of Mahmud into Byzantine territory for his interventions in Muslim territories which eventually led to his defeat and capture in the Battle of Manzikert. Al-Adim's account was the first "to attempt an explanation for the Byzantine campaign". Romanos was also presumed to be unhappy about Mahmud's conversion to Sunni Islam and allegiance to the rising power of the Seljuks.

Mahmud died in 1075, having appointed his youngest son, Shabib, as his successor. However, his oldest son, Nasr, whose mother was the daughter of the Buyid emir Jalal al-Dawla, was recognised as his successor.

== Sources ==
- Bianquis, Thierry (1993). "Mirdās, Banū or Mirdāsids". In Bosworth, C. E.; van Donzel, E.; Heinrichs, W. P. & Pellat, Ch. (eds.). The Encyclopaedia of Islam, Second Edition. Volume VII: Mif–Naz. Leiden: E. J. Brill. pp. 115–123. doi:10.1163/1573-3912_islam_SIM_5220. ISBN 978-90-04-09419-2.

Preceded by Mu'izz al-Dawla Thimal	Mirdasid Emir of Aleppo; 1060–1061	Succeeded by Mu'izz al-Daula Thimal
Preceded by 'Atiyya ibn Salih	Mirdasid Emir of Aleppo; 1065–1075	Succeeded by Nasr ibn Mahmud
