= Al-Hadher, Syria =

Al-Hadher الحاضر
- Town
- Location in Syria
- Coordinates: 35°59′45″N 37°3′27″E
- Country: Syria
- Governorate: Aleppo
- District: Mount Simeon
- Subdistrict: al-Hadher

Population (2004)
  - Total: 8,550
- Time zone: UTC+3 (AST)
- City Qrya Pcode: C1182

Al-Hadher (Arabic: الحاضر; transliteration: al-Ḥāḍir) is a village in northern Syria, administratively part of the Mount Simeon District of the Aleppo Governorate. According to the Syria Central Bureau of Statistics (CBS), al-Hadher had a population of 8,550 in the 2004 census.

It is 4 kilometers east of the ancient town of Qinnasrin (Chalcis ad Belum). It was founded by the Arab tribe of Tanukh as a ḥāḍir (a settlement of sedentarized Bedouin) in the 4th century under Byzantine rule. Al-Hadher served as the headquarters of Jund Qinnasrin, (military district of Qinnasrin).

== Syrian Civil War ==
On 8 August 2012, the Free Syrian Army captured al-Hadher.

== Bibliography ==
- Burns, Ross (1992). Monuments of Syria: A Guide. I. B. Tauris. ISBN 9781845119478.
- Sauvaget, J. (1971). "Halab". In Lewis, B.; Ménage, V. L.; Pellat, Ch. & Schacht, J. (eds.). The Encyclopaedia of Islam, Second Edition. Volume III: H–Iram. Leiden: E. J. Brill. pp. 85–90. OCLC 495469525.
