= Battle of al-Uqhuwana =

1029 battle in Palestine

Coordinates: 31°51′57.5″N 34°44′46.75″E

Date	May 25, 1029
Location	al-Uqhuwana (eastern shore of Lake Tiberias)
Result	Fatimid Victory

Belligerents
Fatimid Caliphate; Banu Kalb; Banu Fazara	Banu Kilab (Mirdasids); Banu Tayy (Jarrahids)

Commanders and leaders
Anushtakin al-Dizbari; Rafi ibn Abi'l-Layl	Salih ibn Mirdas †; Hassan ibn al-Mufarrij

The Battle of al-Uqhuwana (Arabic: يوم الأُقْحوَانة, romanized: Yawm al-Uqḥuwāna) was fought at a place east of Lake Tiberias in May 1029 between the Fatimid Caliphate under general Anushtakin al-Dizbari and a coalition of Syrian Arab Bedouin tribes.

The Bedouin tribes were represented by the Tayy tribe of Palestine led by the Jarrahid emir Hassan ibn al-Mufarrij and the Kilab tribe of Aleppo under the Mirdasid emir Salih ibn Mirdas. The Fatimids were backed by one of the Bedouin coalition's former constituent tribes, the Kalb under the emir Rafi ibn Abi'l-Layl. The battle ended in the Fatimids' most decisive victory over the Bedouin tribes of Syria. Salih was slain and the Mirdasids' quickly lost several strategic towns, while Hassan and the Tayy long retreated from their traditional stomping grounds. Fatimid rule was consequently reasserted over Palestine and southern Syria, including Damascus, after years of Bedouin domination since 1024.

== Location ==
Al-Uqhuwana was located off the eastern shore of Lake Tiberias. It was close to where the River Jordan empties into the lake, at the foot of Aqabat Fiq, a strategic mountain pass through which the road connecting Damascus to Beisan in Palestine passed. The precise location of al-Uqhuwana has yet to be identified, though there have been a number of attempts that were "not convincing", according to the historian Moshe Gil. A Karaite source refers to al-Uqhuwana as the general name for the area south of Lake Tiberias.

== Background ==
=== Bedouin alliance in Syria ===
A series of events in 1023–1024 provided an impetus for the Bedouin tribes of Syria to attempt to seize political power in the region. Among the destabilizing conditions were the factional strife in the Fatimid court following the disappearance of Caliph al-Hakim in 1021 and a severe famine in the capital Cairo in 1023. The governor of Damascus, al-Hakim's cousin and nominated successor Abd al-Rahim ibn Ilyas, was arrested and executed in Cairo. The latter's son Abd al-Aziz and nephew Ahmad ibn al-Tayyib fled Damascus for ten months, granted asylum from Salih ibn Mirdas, the Mirdasid emir of the Bedouin Banu Kilab tribe, which dominated northern Syria and maintained friendly relations with the Aleppo governor Aziz al-Dawla appointed by the Fatimids. According to the historian Suhayl Zakkar, Salih's protection of Abd al-Rahim's relatives negatively impacted his relationship with the Fatimids and provided "encouragement and an excuse" for him to oppose the central government.

Toward the end of al-Hakim's reign or the beginning of Caliph al-Zahir's reign, the three largest Bedouin tribes of Syria, the Kilab under Mirdasid dynasty, the Tayy of Transjordan under the Jarrahid emir Hassan ibn al-Mufarrij, and the Kalb of the Damascus region under Sinan ibn Ulayyan, entered into an alliance. The pact stipulated the three tribes' division of Syria among themselves, with the Tayy to establish their realm in Palestine as far west as al-Arish on the borders of Egypt, the Kalb in Damascus and the Kilab in the region between Aleppo and Anah on the Euphrates. Such alliance among Bedouins had not occurred since the 7th century. Moreover, its formation surprised Syria's population at the time, who were unaccustomed to the spectacle of Bedouin chiefs seeking kingship in the cities rather than nomadic life in the desert fringe. From a military standpoint, Salih was the "outstanding figure" of the alliance, according to Zakkar, while Hassan oversaw correspondence with the Fatimid court.

=== Bedouin revolt ===
==== Sack of Ramla ====
In September 1024, the Fatimid military governor of Palestine, Anushtakin al-Dizbari, entered into conflict with Hassan. The latter possessed an iqta in Bayt Jibrin, in southern Palestine, where he was granted the right to collect taxes by the Fatimids in exchange for his military service. Anushtakin dispatched his own tax collectors to Bayt Jibrin, who were killed by Hassan's men, prompting Anushtakin to arrest two of Hassan's top administrative aides in Ramla, the capital of Palestine. Anushtakin also obtained the sanction of the Fatimid court to move against Hassan in his stronghold in the highlands of Nablus, while Hassan was reportedly ill. Hassan repulsed the subsequent Fatimid assault and besieged Ramla, while his forces plundered Tiberias, forcing the governor of that city to flee for Acre on the coast.

Hassan was reinforced by Salih and his Kilabi warriors, while Anushtakin called for reinforcements from Cairo. The Fatimids were unable to prepare and dispatch an army from Egypt, leaving Anushtakin beleaguered. After minor clashes, he fled Ramla with ten of his Turkish ghilman (slave soldiers or pages) to the port town of Caesarea. As his Bedouin forces wrought much suffering to the inhabitants of Ramla, Hassan initially attempted to convince them of his loyalty to the Fatimid caliph, his dispute being solely with Anushtakin. To that end, he appointed Nasr Allah ibn Nizal, a member of a famous Fatimid military family, as governor of Ramla.

Hassan's immediate goal was to secure the release of his administrative aides from their imprisonment in the coastal town of Ascalon, which he achieved through military pressure and fake letters attributed to Caliph al-Zahir. After their release, Hassan had Ramla plundered, many of its Fatimid garrison executed, and many women and children enslaved, while he confiscated substantial sums of money and several properties of Ramla's well-off residents. He ended his attack by having the city burned. Afterward, the Fatimids granted Hassan's request for the iqta of Nablus, which he practically controlled anyway, while denying him his request for Jerusalem.

Anushtakin was kept in his post and promoted to the rank of amir al-umara (chief commander), despite provoking the conflict with Hassan, whose strength he grossly miscalculated, abandoning his troops in Ramla, and failing to prevent the destruction of Ramla and Tiberias, according to the historian Yaacov Lev. In the assessment of Thierry Bianquis, had Anushtakin received good troops from Cairo, he would have easily crushed the Tayy, whose reputation for battlefield prowess was poor. Receiving little to no support from Cairo, either financially or militarily, Anushtakin launched an operation briefly capturing Ramla, before being forced to retreat behind the walls of Ascalon. He renewed the offensive together with the forces of the Acre-based governor of Tiberias and the governor of Jerusalem, Fath al-Qal'i, but after reports of a successful raid on a Bedouin camp, the historical record offers no further details of the campaign against the Bedouin at this stage.

==== Dismissal of Anushtakin and peak of Bedouin power ====
In Cairo, Fatimid politics stabilized and the new vizier, al-Rudhabari, recalled Anushtakin from Palestine in 1026. By then, the Bedouin situation had stabilized, with the Jarrahids dominating Palestine and the Mirdasids having conquered Aleppo, which became the center of an emirate extending from al-Rahba on the border with Iraq to Sidon on the Mediterranean coast. In Damascus, Sinan and Salih were unable to capture Damascus, where a local dignitary forged an alliance between the Fatimid troops there and the city's ahdath (local militia), which repulsed the Bedouins.

In 1025, Hassan had issued a letter to the caliph. In it, the Bedouin chief advises al-Zahir that the Bedouin revolt was not directed toward him and the Bedouin allies would continue to recognize his suzerainty. In a cynical style, Hassan informed the caliph that he would collect the taxes in Palestine and spend it on his men, precluding the need for a Fatimid governor or troops, while Sinan had entered a similar arrangement with the people of Damascus and Salih was in control of Aleppo, thus "[relieving al-Zahir] of all anxiety concerning the whole of Syria". Al-Zahir, "incapable" of challenging the Bedouin, did not provide a response to the "insulting and humiliating letter", in the words of Zakkar. According to Bianquis, in Syria, the Fatimid state preferred the smaller and weaker Bedouin principalities to a powerful commander with a large army in control of the region. This policy guided Anushtakin's dismissal.

However, the scale of the Jarrahids' depredations in Palestine sapped the economic potential of Palestine as an agriculturally rich and prosperous province complementary to Egypt. According to Zakkar, while the Fatimid state tolerated the Mirdasid–Kilabi emirate in Aleppo, which publicly recognized the caliph and minted coins in the names of Salih and al-Zahir, they "entirely rejected" such a state in Palestine by the Jarrahid-led Tayy on Egypt's border, which posed a threat to the Fatimid Caliphate itself. Moreover, the Fatimid state feared Damascus, which staved off the attempted Bedouin takeover without Cairo's assistance, would seek an alternative to Fatimid sovereignty.

== Battle ==
Al-Rudhabari was replaced as vizier by Ali al-Jarjara'i in 1027. While distrustful of Anushtakin, al-Jarjara'i sought to impose order throughout the Caliphate and was compelled to send him to Syria to rein in the Jarrahids in November–December 1028. When asked by the vizier what he required for the campaign, Anushtakin offered a response which became famous:

My mare, al-Barda'iyya, and a tent under which to keep me in the shade.

Anushtakin was fitted with an army of seven thousand cavalry and infantry. Though given a meager 5,000 dinars for expenditures, he was assigned a fiscal adviser, Sadaqa ibn Yusuf al-Falahi, who managed the financing of the campaign. The timing of the operation was also fortunate for the Fatimids, as Sinan had died in June–July 1028 and his nephew, Rafi ibn Abi'l-Layl, was not committed to the Bedouin alliance. He met the caliph in Cairo and removed the Kalb from the rebel coalition in return for being formally recognized as emir of the Kalb and possession of his uncle's iqta. According to Lev, "from the Fatimid point of view", with the Kalb's defection, "the Bedouin coalition which faced them in 1024–1025 had finally collapsed". In addition to Anushtakin's government troops, he had thousands of Bedouin auxiliaries from the Kalb and other loyalist tribes, mainly the Fazara, a tribe which was numerous in the Hauran and the Jordan Valley.

In late December, Anushtakin arrived in Ramla, where he celebrated Eid al-Adha. From there, he proceeded to Jerusalem, where his forces combined with the Kalb under Rafi and the other Bedouin auxiliaries. Hassan called on Salih for support, and the Mirdasid emir arrived with his sons and warriors to defend Bedouin autonomy in Syria. After an encounter in the region of Gaza, Salih and Hassan retreated northward.

The two sides met at al-Uqhuwana on 12 May or 29 May 1029. Hassan and his Tayyi warriors deserted the field, either as a result of "treachery or cowardice", and their flight was the deciding factor in the Bedouins' subsequent defeat, according to Zakkar. On their desertion, Bianquis comments that the Tayy's "irresistible instinct for self-preservation had saved them from a catastrophe they themselves had caused". Salih fought on but, having become exhausted, disembarked from his horse to allow it a moment of rest and removed his helmet. The contemporary chronicles report that a Bedouin under Rafi's command, named as Tarif of the Fazara or Rayhan al-Juwayni, caught up with and knocked Salih down and took his horse, after which another Fazara Bedouin, called al-Zubaydi, decapitated him on the ground and gave his head to Rafi, who delivered it to Anushtakin. Salih's youngest son was also slain, as was his influential Aleppine Christian vizier, Tadharus ibn al-Hasan, who was crucified. As with many medieval battles, the death of the leader signaled the defeat and dispersal of his troops. Anushtakin prostrated in prayer and rewarded Tarif and al-Zubaydi 1,000 dinars each and Rafi 5,000 dinars for their role in Salih's death. Salih's body was posted on the wall of Sidon's gate, while his head and that of his son were later displayed in Cairo.

== Aftermath ==
Describing the total rout of the Tayyi–Kilabi forces, a chronicler commented, "the sword struck them, settling their fate". It was the Fatimids' most decisive victory against the Bedouin of Syria and firmly established their rule in Palestine and southern Damascus. Anushtakin immediately seized Salih's Turkish ghilman and proceeded to establish headquarters in Damascus. In quick succession, the Mirdasid-held towns of Sidon, Baalbek, Hisn Ibn Akkar, Homs, and Rafaniyya were abandoned by Salih's governors and restored to Fatimid rule. For his success against the Bedouins, Anushtakin received the additional titles of al-Amir al-Muzaffar ('the Victorious General'), Sayf al-Khilafa wa 'Uddat al-Imam ('Sword of the Caliphate and Treasure of the Imam'), Mustafa al-Mulk ('Choice of the Realm'), and Muntajab al-Dawla ('the Excellent One of the Dynasty').

The Kilab's reputed supremacy in the field was shattered at al-Uqhuwana, and the death and mutilation of Salih was lamented by the Syrian Arab poet al-Ma'arri in verse. Salih's son Nasr survived the battle and returned to head the emirate in Aleppo, which remained under Mirdasid control until Nasr was slain and the city captured by Anushtakin in 1038. The Tayy, meanwhile, had escaped to their old stomping grounds in the Jibal of Transjordan, never recovering their footing in Palestine.

== Sources ==
- Bianquis, Thierry (1989). Damas et la Syrie sous la domination fatimide (359-468/969-1076): essai d'interprétation de chroniques arabes médiévales. Deuxième tome (in French). Damascus: Institut français de Damas. ISBN 978-2-35159131-4.
- Gil, Moshe (1997) [1983]. A History of Palestine, 634–1099. Translated by Ethel Broido. Cambridge: Cambridge University Press. ISBN 0-521-59984-9.
- Lev, Yaacov (2003). "Turks in the Political and Military Life of Eleventh-Century Egypt and Syria". In Hidemitsu, Kuroki (ed.). The Influence of Human Mobility in Muslim Societies. Kegan Paul. ISBN 0710308027.
- Salibi, Kamal S. (1977). Syria Under Islam: Empire on Trial, 634–1097, Volume 1. Delmar: Caravan Books. ISBN 9780882060132.
- Sharon, Moshe (1997). Corpus Inscriptionum Arabicarum Palaestinae, Volume One: -A-. Leiden: Brill. ISBN 90-04-10833-5.
- Smoor, Pieter (1985). Kings and Bedouins in the Palace of Aleppo as Reflected in Maʻarrī's Works. University of Manchester. ISBN 9780950788555.
- Zakkar, Suhayl (1971). The Emirate of Aleppo: 1004–1094. Aleppo: Dar al-Amanah.
