= Awhad =

Awhad, Awhadi, or al-Awhad (Arabic: الاوحد, lit. 'the Unique One, the Unparalleled One') is a masculine given name of Arabic origin. Notable people with the name include:

== Given name ==
- al-Awhad (son of Badr al-Jamali) (died 1087), Fatimid governor of Alexandria and heir-apparent of his father
- al-Awhad Ayyub (died 1210), Ayyubid ruler of Diyar Bakr
- Awhad al-Din Kermani (died 1238), Persian poet and Sufi mystic
- Awhadi Maraghai (1274/75–1338), Persian Sufi poet
