= Sinan ibn Ulayyan =

Sinān ibn ʿUlayyān or Sinān ibn al-Bannā (fl. 992 – c. 1028), also known by his laqab (honorific epithet) Ṣamṣām al-Dawla (Arabic: صمصام الدولة, lit. 'Lion of the Dynasty'), was a preeminent emir of the Banu Kalb tribe in Syria under early Fatimid rule. He was an ally of the Fatimids in several campaigns, until rebelling against them in alliance with the chiefs of the Arab tribes of Tayy and Kilab in 1025. Sinan attempted to take over Damascus from its Fatimid ruler, but died in 1028. His nephew Rafi ibn Abi'l-Layl reverted to allying with the Fatimids against the Tayy and Kilab.

== Emir of the Banu Kalb ==
A probable brother of Sinan, referred to as 'Ibn Ulayyan al-Adawi' in the sources, led the Banu Adi clan of the Banu Kalb in the army of Sayf al-Dawla (r. 945–967) in a campaign against the Byzantines. Later, when the Fatimid Caliphate first invaded Syria in 970, Ibn Ulayyan captured the fleeing pro-Abbasid chief of the ahdath (urban militia) of Damascus, Ibn Abi Ya'la, in Kalbite territory in Palmyra. In return for a bounty of 100,000 dirhams, Ibn Ulayyan sent him to the Fatimid commander in Damascus, Ja'far ibn Fallah, in November 970. This move started a century-long relationship between the Kalb and the Egypt-based Fatimids.

Sinan emerges in the historical record in 992 when he, at the head of the Kalb, and Mufarrij ibn Daghfal ibn al-Jarrah, at the head of the Tayy, joined the forces of the Turkic Fatimid commander Manjutakin during the latter's war against Manjutakin's rival military faction of the Kutama Berber commander al-Hasan ibn Ammar. The sides fought a skirmish at Rafah followed by a decisive battle at Ascalon where Sinan and Mufarrij defected to the Kutama side and Manjutakin was defeated and fled.

In 1016, Sinan and Mufarrij led their respective tribesmen again in service to the Fatimids, this time under directions from Caliph al-Hakim (r. 996–1021), against the rebel commander of Aleppo, Fath al-Qal'i, and the Banu Kilab chief Salih ibn Mirdas.

=== Siege of Damascus ===
Toward the end of al-Hakim's reign or the beginning of Caliph al-Zahir's reign (r. 1021–1036), Sinan and his brother-in-law, Mufarrij's' son Hassan, entered their tribes into a pact with Salih ibn Mirdas, whereby they would divide Fatimid Syria between themselves, with the Kalb under Sinan controlling Damascus. The pact was initially nullified after a reconciliation with the Fatimids, but renewed again in 1024 following a resumption of the Tayy's rebellion in Palestine. Sinan and Hassan visited Salih's camp outside Aleppo where the three launched their war.

By October 1024, the Kalb under Sinan had begun its siege of Damascus, while the Tayy had taken over Ramla, the capital of Palestine, and the Kilab was besieging Aleppo. The Kalb faced stiff resistance by the defenders of Damascus, consisting of the Fatimid garrison led by the governor Ibn Hamdan and the local militia under Abu Ya'la Ibn Abi'l-Jinn. The latter had reconciled the Fatimids and Damascenes and organized the defense of the city, whereby each defending faction would fight on alternate days. Sinan's Kalbites were early on backed by 3,000 warriors under Salih ibn Mirdas, and later, after the Tayy's sack of Ramla, by even more Bedouin horsemen.

Although the arrival of Kilab and Tayy reinforcements further strained the defenders' abilities, the Damascenes under Ibn Abi'l-Jinn refused to accept Sinan's offer to relieve the siege for a 30,000-dinar payment, fearing such an agreement would not be honored by the Bedouin. The latter had the advantage of being able to launch rapid assaults and then withdraw into the steppes to evade pursuit. They devastated the Ghouta oasis around Damascus and the Marj pasture grounds which encircled the Ghouta. The peasants from these regions who were not massacred fled for safety behind the city walls and joined the defense. The Bedouins focused mainly on looting grain stocks and suffered heavy casualties, with the Kalb losing some two hundred men and Sinan being wounded by an arrow. The Kalb elders and the Damascenes negotiated a truce, but after Sinan was reproached by Hassan, the tribe resumed the siege. Much of the fighting took place at Darayya, which suffered particular devastation, and the Damascenes were able to restore their city's defenses. By early 1025, the Damascenes had repulsed Sinan, who appears to have abandoned his designs to take the city, as his Tayy and Kilab counterparts had seized their targets, Ramla and Aleppo, respectively.

== Death, succession, and descendants ==
In 1028, Sinan died and the tripartite alliance among the Arab tribes in Syria weakened as a result. His nephew, Rafi ibn Abi'l-Layl, succeeded him over the Kalb and defected to the Fatimids. He played a leading role in the subsequent rout of the Tayy and Kilab by the Fatimid general Anushtakin al-Dizbari at the Battle of al-Uqhuwana in 1029.

In 1069, Sinan's son Mismar, by then a leader of the Kalb, led an abortive siege of Damascus in support of a local faction poised against its Fatimid garrison. Mismar's son Izz al-Din Hassan is credited by an inscription for founding the fortress of Salkhad. In the 12th century, a son of Hassan, Amir, is mentioned as being in a theological debate about the Ash'ari school of thought.

== Bibliography ==
- Bianquis, Thierry (1986). Damas et la Syrie sous la domination fatimide (359-468/969-1076): essai d'interprétation de chroniques arabes médiévales. Tome premier (in French). Damascus: Institut français de Damas. ISBN 978-2-35159130-7.
- Bianquis, Thierry (1989). Damas et la Syrie sous la domination fatimide (359-468/969-1076): essai d'interprétation de chroniques arabes médiévales. Deuxième tome (in French). Damascus: Institut français de Damas. ISBN 978-2-35159131-4.
- Zakkar, Suhayl (1971). The Emirate of Aleppo: 1004–1094. Beirut: Dar al-Amanah. OCLC 759803726.
