= Abu'l-Barakat al-Husayn al-Jarjara'i =

Abu'l-Barakat al-Husayn ibn Muhammad al-Jarjara'i was a Fatimid official. He was the nephew of the long-serving vizier Ali ibn Ahmad al-Jarjara'i, and became vizier himself in 1048. He held the office for 19 months before being dismissed for his tyrannical behaviour in February 1050 and banished to Tyre.

== Sources ==
- al-Imad, Leila S. (1990). The Fatimid Vizierate (979-1172). Berlin: Klaus Schwarz Verlag. ISBN 3-922968-82-1.
- Klemm, Verena (2003). Memoirs of a Mission: The Ismaili Scholar, Statesman and Poet, Al-Mu'yyad Fi'l Din Al-Shirazi. London and New York: I.B.Tauris. ISBN 1-85043-422-0.

Preceded by Sadaqah ibn Yusuf al-Falahi	Vizier of the Fatimid Caliphate; 1048–1049	Succeeded by Sa'id ibn Masud
