= Jarjaraya =

City in medieval Iraq

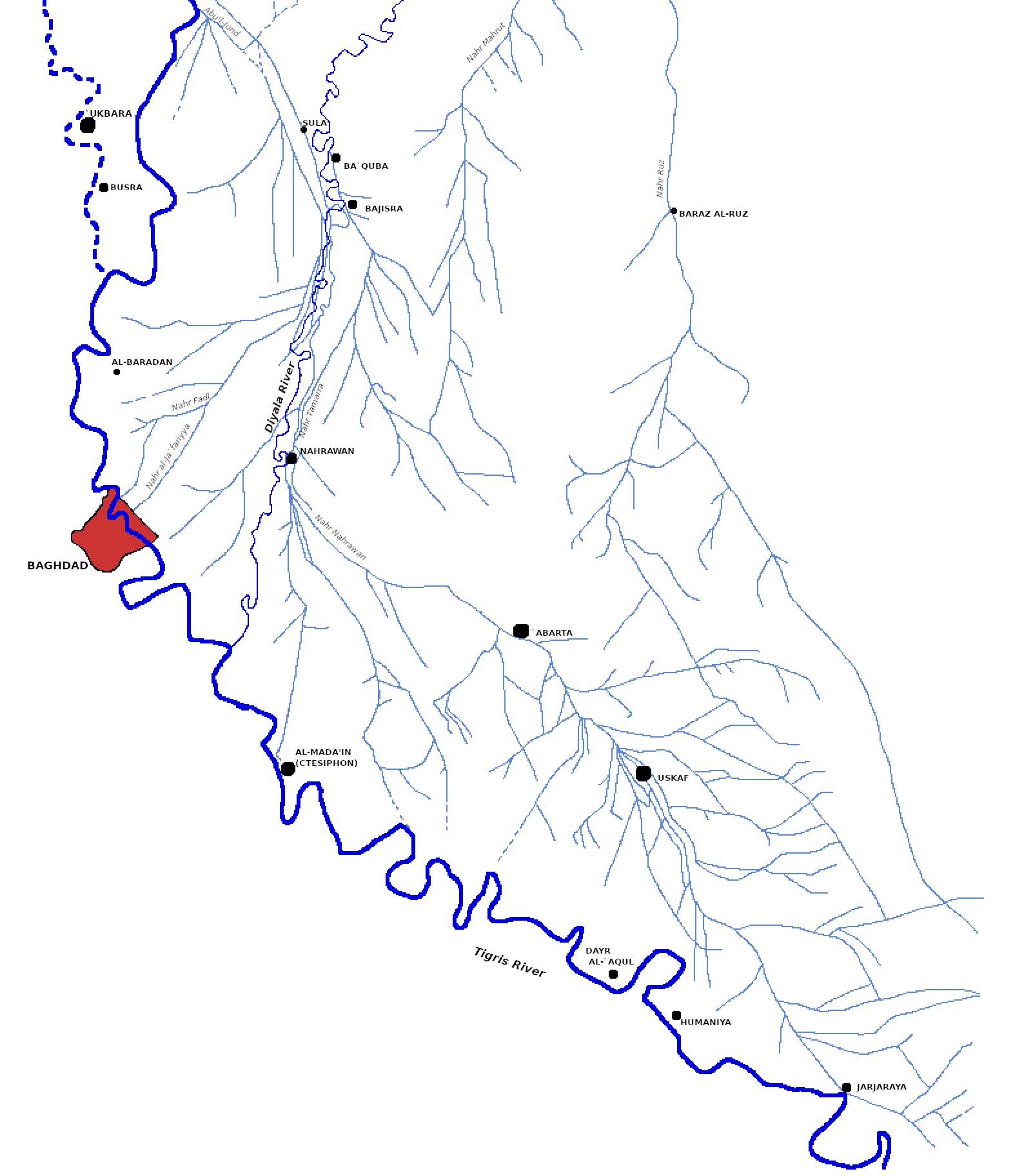
Map showing Jarjaraya in relation to other contemporary sites in the region

Jarjarāyā was a city of medieval Iraq, surrounded by a meander of the Tigris. Capital of the district of Lower Nahrawan, it was inhabited by Persian nobles, according to Ya'qubi. This has been taken to assume that Jarjaraya was founded in the Sasanian period, if not earlier. By the time of Yaqut al-Hamawi in the early 1200s, however, the town was in ruins. Archaeological evidence suggests that the site was abandoned by the end of the Abbasid period.

Several medieval viziers had origins here, as indicated in their nisbas. Two Abbasid viziers, Al-Abbas ibn al-Hasan al-Jarjara'i and Ahmad ibn al-Khasib al-Jarjara'i, were from Jarjaraya, as was the eleventh-century Fatimid vizier Abu'l-Qasim al-Jarjara'i, who held the position for 18 years.

== Sources ==
- Adams, Robert M. (1965). Land Behind Baghdad: A History of Settlement on the Diyala Plains. Chicago and London: University of Chicago Press. OCLC 899942882.
- van Berkel, Maaike (2013). Crisis and Continuity at the Abbasid Court: Formal and Informal Politics in the Caliphate of al-Muqtadir. Leiden: Koninklijke Brill NV. ISBN 978-9004252707.
- Le Strange, Guy (1905). The Lands of the Eastern Caliphate: Mesopotamia, Persia, and Central Asia, from the Moslem Conquest to the Time of Timur. Cambridge: Cambridge University Press. OCLC 458169031.
- Lev, Yaacov. "Army, Regime, and Society in Fatimid Egypt, 358-487/968-1094." International Journal of Middle East Studies 19, no. 3 (1987): 337-65. Accessed March 5, 2020. www.jstor.org/stable/163658.
