= Anushtakin al-Dizbari =

Fatimid statesman and general (d. 1042)

Sharaf al-Maʿālī (Note: Anushtakin was also styled the following honorific titles: al-amīr al-muẓaffar (commander wreathed in victory); amīr al-juyūsh (commander of the armies); ʿuddat al-imām (the treasure of the imam, i.e. the caliph); sayf al-khilāfa (sword of the Caliphate); ʿaḍud ad-dawla (support of the state); and muṣṭafā al-mulk (the realm's choice).) Abu Manṣūr Anūshtakīn al-Dizbarī

Fatimid Governor of Aleppo
- In office 1038–1041
- Appointed by: Al-Mustansir
- Lieutenant: Banjutekin
- Preceded by: Nasr ibn Salih
- Succeeded by: Thimal ibn Salih

Fatimid Governor of Damascus
- In office 1029–1041
- Appointed by: Az-Zahir

Fatimid Military Governor of Palestine
- In office 1023–1026
- Appointed by: Az-Zahir

Fatimid Governor of Baalbek
- In office 1017–1022
- Appointed by: Al-Hakim

Personal details
- Born: Unknown Khuttal, Transoxiana
- Died: January 1042 Citadel of Aleppo

Sharaf al-Maʿālī Abu Manṣūr Anūshtakīn al-Dizbarī (died January 1042) was a Fatimid statesman and general who became the most powerful Fatimid governor of Syria. Under his Damascus-based administration, all of Syria was united under a single Fatimid authority. Near-contemporary historians, including Ibn al-Qalanisi of Damascus and Ibn al-Adim of Aleppo, noted Anushtakin's wealth, just rule and fair treatment of the population, with whom he was popular.

An ethnic Turk, Anushtakin was enslaved in his homeland of Transoxiana and sold in Damascus in 1009 to Dizbar ibn Awnim, a Daylamite Fatimid officer. After working as a guard for Dizbar's properties, Anushtakin became a ghulam (slave soldier) in Caliph al-Hakim's court in Cairo, and in 1014/15, was made an officer. Between 1017 and 1023, Anushtakin grew wealthy, gained local renown, and developed a deep understanding of Syrian affairs during his governorship of Ba'albek and Caesarea. Afterward, he was assigned to Ramla as military governor of Palestine and confronted the powerful Jarrahids, a leading family of the Banu Tayy bedouins that often menaced Palestine's inhabitants. He was dealt with significant battlefield defeats and was recalled and imprisoned in Cairo in 1026, but was soon after freed. Two years later, vizier Ali al-Jarjara'i dispatched him with an army against the Tayy and Kilab tribes in Syria, whom Anushtakin routed near Lake Tiberias in 1029.

Anushtakin consolidated his authority over Syria by forming alliances with the local nobility, particularly Rafi ibn Abi'l Layl of the Kalb tribe, reining in Bedouin depredations, reconciling with the Jarrahids and acquiring numerous ghilman. In the mid-1030s, tensions developed between Anushtakin and al-Jarjara'i because the latter feared Anushtakin's growing political ambition. Al-Jarjara'i stoked conflict between Anushtakin and the Mirdasid emir of Aleppo, Shibl al-Dawla Nasr, which ended when Anushtakin defeated and killed Nasr in 1037. The following year, Anushtakin captured Aleppo with little resistance, marking the first and last time all of Syria was ruled by a single Fatimid governor. Anushtakin's rule in Damascus came to an end after an army mutiny engineered by al-Jarjara'i forced him to flee for the Aleppo citadel; he died there amid accusations of betraying Caliph al-Mustansir. Fifteen years later, the latter honored Anushtakin by relocating his grave to Jerusalem.

== Sources ==
The most comprehensive contemporary biography of Anushtakin was written by the Damascene historian, Ibn al-Qalanisi (d. 1160). According to modern historian Yaacov Lev, the "richness of details" Ibn al-Qalanisi provided about Anushtakin was "unusual" at the time for biographies on military slaves. Ibn al-Adim (1193–1262) was a major source for information regarding Anushtakin's governorship of Aleppo, while al-Maqrizi (1364–1442) documented several stories about Anushtakin's career in Cairo. Lev maintains that all three of the aforementioned medieval historians stressed Anushtakin's "just rule and fair treatment of the population in the towns he ruled as governor".

== Biography ==
=== Origins and military slavery ===
Anushtakin was an ethnic Turk born in Khuttal, (Note: Anushtakin's year of birth was not provided by contemporary chroniclers.) a mountainous principality in Transoxiana; from there, he was captured and sold into slavery in Kashgar. He escaped to Bukhara, but was again captured and enslaved. He was then taken to the Abbasid capital of Baghdad. Afterward, he was moved to Fatimid-held Damascus in 1009/10, where he was purchased and employed by Dizbiri ibn Awnim (also known as Dizbar), a Fatimid officer of Daylamite descent who had previously served the Hamdanids. Anushtakin acquired the nisba (surname) "al-Dizbari" from his master; his Turkish given name, "Anajtekin", which means "adult-prince", was commonly transcribed in Arabic as "Anushtakin" or "Anashtajin". For the next three years, Anushtakin successfully protected Dizbiri's properties as his steward.

In 1012, Dizbiri conceded to Anushtakin's wish to serve Caliph al-Hakim (r. 996–1021) in Cairo, where he became a ghulam (slave soldier; pl. ghilman) in the hujra (training barracks). He demonstrated martial talents during his training. There are scant details about Anushtakin's time in the hujra, though it is known that he was dismissive of his younger and less experienced colleagues whom he insulted with mocking nicknames. He completed his training relatively quickly by 1014/15, after which he was manumitted from enslavement.

=== Early career ===
Anushtakin acquired a position in the Fatimid court and caught the attention of al-Hakim, who made him an army officer. After serving a year in al-Hakim's court, Anushtakin was posted in Damascus in the retinue of a Fatimid general. He resided in the home of a certain Hayyus in the Zuqaq-Attaf quarter where he became friends with Hayyus's son and poet, Muhammad ibn Hayyus; the latter later dedicated several panegyrics to Anushtakin. While in the city, Anushtakin tracked down and met Dizbiri to pay respect to his old master.

Though contemporary sources do not indicate when Anushtakin learned Arabic and converted to Islam, Lev presumes it occurred during his time in Damascus. It is not clear which tradition of Islam Anushtakin followed. However, al-Maqrizi indicated that Anushtakin subscribed to Isma'ili Shia Islam, the religion of the Fatimid state, but toward the end of his life, he deviated from the Isma'ili madhab (school of thought), which was rarely practiced in Damascus, possibly to Sunni Islam. Lev doubts that Anushtakin ever deviated from the state religion, and asserts that in any case, Anushtakin firmly forsook his pagan past for a Muslim frame of reference.

Anushtakin's stay in Damascus was cut short when he was recalled to Cairo. By 1017, he was made wali (governor) of Ba'albek. He held the post for roughly four years, during which he developed a positive reputation among the inhabitants. It was in Ba'albek that Anushtakin acquired his own ghilman, and through them, he gained the significant wealth and knowledge of regional affairs that proved critical to his future political career in Syria, according to historian Suhayl Zakkar. At this time, he also came under the patronage of the Fatimids' Armenian governor of Aleppo, Fatik Aziz ad-Dawla.

=== Governor of Palestine ===
After his service in Ba'albek, Anushtakin was briefly made walī of Caesarea (Qaysariya), a port city in northern Palestine, which contemporary sources stated he governed well. He was promoted again in 1023 to mutawalī ḥarb (military governor) of Jund Filastin (province of Palestine). That same year, he issued an order forbidding anyone from harming the Franciscan friars of Jerusalem.

At the time of Anushtakin's appointment, inland Palestine was dominated by the Jarrahids, the ruling clan of the Bedouin tribe of Tayy, who often plundered the region's settlements. In August 1024, Anushtakin confronted the Jarrahids, "whose strength he grossly miscalculated", according to Lev. He sent troops to collect the taxes of Bayt Jibrin, the iqtaʿ (fief) of the Jarrahid and Tayy chieftain, Hassan ibn Mufarrij, but the Jarrahids killed the collectors. Anushtakin retaliated by imprisoning two of Hassan's senior aides in Ascalon and gained permission from Caliph az-Zahir (1021–1036) to attack Hassan while the latter was incapacitated by illness. Anushtakin proceeded to lead an expedition in the mountains around Nablus to apprehend Hassan. However, the latter had since recovered and with 3,000 of his horsemen, repulsed Anushtakin, who retreated to Ramla, the capital of Palestine.

The Jarrahids retaliated against Anushtakin by besieging him Ramla and plundering and massacring the inhabitants of Tiberias. Anushtakin's position was boosted with the defection of Hassan's brother, Thabit, to his camp, but this was short-lived as Thabit betrayed Anushtakin, and the Tayy, Kalb and Kilab Bedouin confederations formed an alliance against him. (Note: The alliance stipulated that the Tayy under Jarrahid leadership would control Palestine up to the borders of Egypt, the Kilab under Mirdasid leadership would control the territory between Aleppo and Anah, and the Kalb would control the region of Damascus.) The Fatimids, meanwhile, could not fulfill Anushtakin's request for 2,000 cavalry and infantry reinforcements, and during the cover of night, he fled Ramla for Caesarea with ten of his ghilman. Hassan subsequently freed his aides, sacked Ramla and installed his own governor in the city. His significant defeats notwithstanding, on 26 November, Anushtakin was named amir al-umara (commander of commanders), the first person to be accorded the title by the Fatimids. Desperate to regain some ground from the Jarrahids, Anushtakin moved to recapture Ramla, which he briefly held before being driven back to Ascalon. He then gained the backing of the governor of Jerusalem, Mubarak al-Dawla Fath, and the governor of Tiberias, and led a foray against a Tayy encampment, killing its inhabitants. Nothing is known about the immediate aftermath of Anushtakin's offensives, but in 1026, Hassan persuaded the vizier, al-Hasan al-Rudhbari, to recall Anushtakin to Cairo.

=== Governor of Syria ===
Anushtakin was arrested in Ascalon, then imprisoned in Cairo. His dismissal left the Bedouin alliance in virtual control of Syria. Anushtakin was ultimately released upon the intervention of Sa'id al-Su'ada, a senior eunuch of az-Zahir. Despite his distance from events, Anushtakin remained privy to developments in Palestine and Syria. Al-Rudhbari was replaced as vizier by Ali al-Jarjara'i in December 1027/January 1028 and in November 1028, he assigned Anushtakin to lead a military expedition against the Tayy in Palestine; by then, the Kalb had defected to az-Zahir, weakening the Bedouin alliance and giving the Fatimids an opportunity to reassert their authority in Syria.

At the head of 7,000 infantry, cavalry and Bedouin auxiliaries, Anushtakin marched, in succession, to Ramla and Jerusalem, gathering further troops in the process. The Bedouin alliance mobilized with Hassan leading the Tayy and Salih ibn Mirdas, the Mirdasid emir of Aleppo, commanding the Kilab. In May 1029, Anushtakin and the chieftain of the Kalb, Rafi ibn Abi-Layyal, routed the Tayy and Kilab at the Battle of al-Uqhuwana near Lake Tiberias. The battle ended when Salih was slain, after which many of his comrades were killed as they fled south into the Hejaz. Anushtakin's victory paved the way for the Fatimid reconquest of Syria, with Salih's governors fleeing the coastal fortress of Sidon and the inland fortresses of Baalbek, Homs and Hisn Akkar between Damascus and the Mirdasid capital in Aleppo. Anushtakin, meanwhile, acquired Salih's Turkish ghilman and set up headquarters in Damascus. Afterward, Anushtakin "solidified his position as the most powerful Fatimid governor of Syria", according to Lev.

Though based in Damascus, Anushtakin remained in charge of affairs in Palestine. He consolidated his alliance with the Kalb by marrying Rafi's daughter in 1035. The Kalb and Tayy reconciled by 1030 and in the following year both tribes, then allied with the Byzantines, moved their encampments near Byzantine-held Antioch. Anushtakin launched assaults against the Tayy at Qastun, Inab and al-Arwaj. During Fatimid-Byzantine peace negotiations, in 1033, the Tayy attempted to negotiate a separate peace with Anushtakin to retrieve their iqtaʿat in Palestine. Within a few years, Anushtakin gained the Tayy's backing through an alliance with Hassan's son Allan. Anushtakin also drew support from a faction of the Kilab, the tribe to which the Mirdasids belonged.

=== Conquest of Aleppo ===
Al-Jarjara'i grew wary of Anushtakin's ambition and virtual independence and sought to limit his influence in Syria. At the same time, Caliph al-Munstansir (r. 1036–1094) and Salih's son and Mirdasid emir of Aleppo, Shibl al-Dawla Nasr, reconciled their differences. As a result of these political conditions, the Fatimids transferred to Nasr the governorship of Homs, then under the jurisdiction of Anushtakin's deputy, Ja'far ibn Kulayd al-Kutami. Anushtakin was angered at what he viewed as a conspiracy against him. Al-Jarjara'i, meanwhile, believed that depriving Anushtakin of Homs would inevitably put him in conflict with Nasr, thus weakening both him and the Mirdasids and thereby strengthening the central government's leverage in Syria. Indeed, the enmity between Anushtakin and Nasr, which dated to Anushtakin's killing of Nasr's father in 1029, was rekindled. Ja'far further incited Anushtakin against the Mirdasid threat and Anushtakin made preparations for war against Aleppo.

Before proceeding militarily against Nasr, Anushtakin secured an agreement with the Byzantine Empire, Nasr's ostensible protector; the 1035 Byzantine-Fatimid truce forbade any Fatimid aggression against Mirdasid Aleppo, "for it was a town subject to [Byzantine] tribute". Thus, Anushtakin requested permission from the Byzantine emperor, Michael IV, to "save Aleppo from Nasr", promising to continue the Mirdasids' annual tribute to the Byzantines. After gaining the Byzantines' blessing, Anushtakin confirmed his alliance with the Bedouin tribes around Aleppo, namely the Kalb, Tayy and part of the Kilab. In 1038, he mobilized his Fatimid and Bedouin troops, and advanced northward against the Mirdasid realm. Nasr, meanwhile, was made aware of Anushtakin's mobilization and advanced southward with his army and allies from Kilab. The two sides fought west of Salamiyah, and Anushtakin forced Nasr to retreat and regroup. Anushtakin proceeded to sack Mirdasid-held Hama and continued northward. The two sides met again on 22 May 1038 at Tell al-Fas, a hill just outside of Latimin, northwest of Hama. In the middle of the fighting, Nasr's brother and rival, Mu'izz al-Dawla Thimal, abandoned Nasr's camp and headed for Aleppo to seize the city for himself. This reduced Nasr's force and he was defeated and killed. Nasr's head was delivered to Anushtakin, while his body was hanged on the gates of Hama's citadel.

On hearing of Nasr's death, Thimal felt vulnerable in Aleppo and left for Upper Mesopotamia to gather reinforcements. His cousin Muqallid ibn Kamil was left in charge of Aleppo's citadel, while the city was put under their kinsman Khalifa ibn Jabir al-Kilabi. A division of Anushtakin's troops besieged the city, and after a few days, Khalifa, with the blessing of Aleppo's inhabitants, opened the city's gates to the Fatimid army on 19 June. Anushtakin arrived to Aleppo on 22 June and negotiated Muqallid's surrender of the citadel within a few days. Afterward, he expelled all Mirdasid troops and officials from the city. Thereafter, all city and provincial governors in Syria answered to Anushtakin in Damascus. The Mirdasids continued to hold on to their Upper Mesopotamian possessions, namely the districts of Raqqa, Balis and al-Rahba. Anushtakin's conquest of Aleppo marked the first and last time that all of Syria was under the control of a single Fatimid governor. Al-Jarjara'i did not perceive Anushtakin's conquest of Aleppo, which he opposed, as a restoration of direct Fatimid rule, but rather as the beginning of the Fatimids' complete loss of Syria. Nonetheless, the central government in Cairo conceded to Anushtakin and Caliph al-Mustansir granted him the governorship of Aleppo.

=== Later years and downfall ===
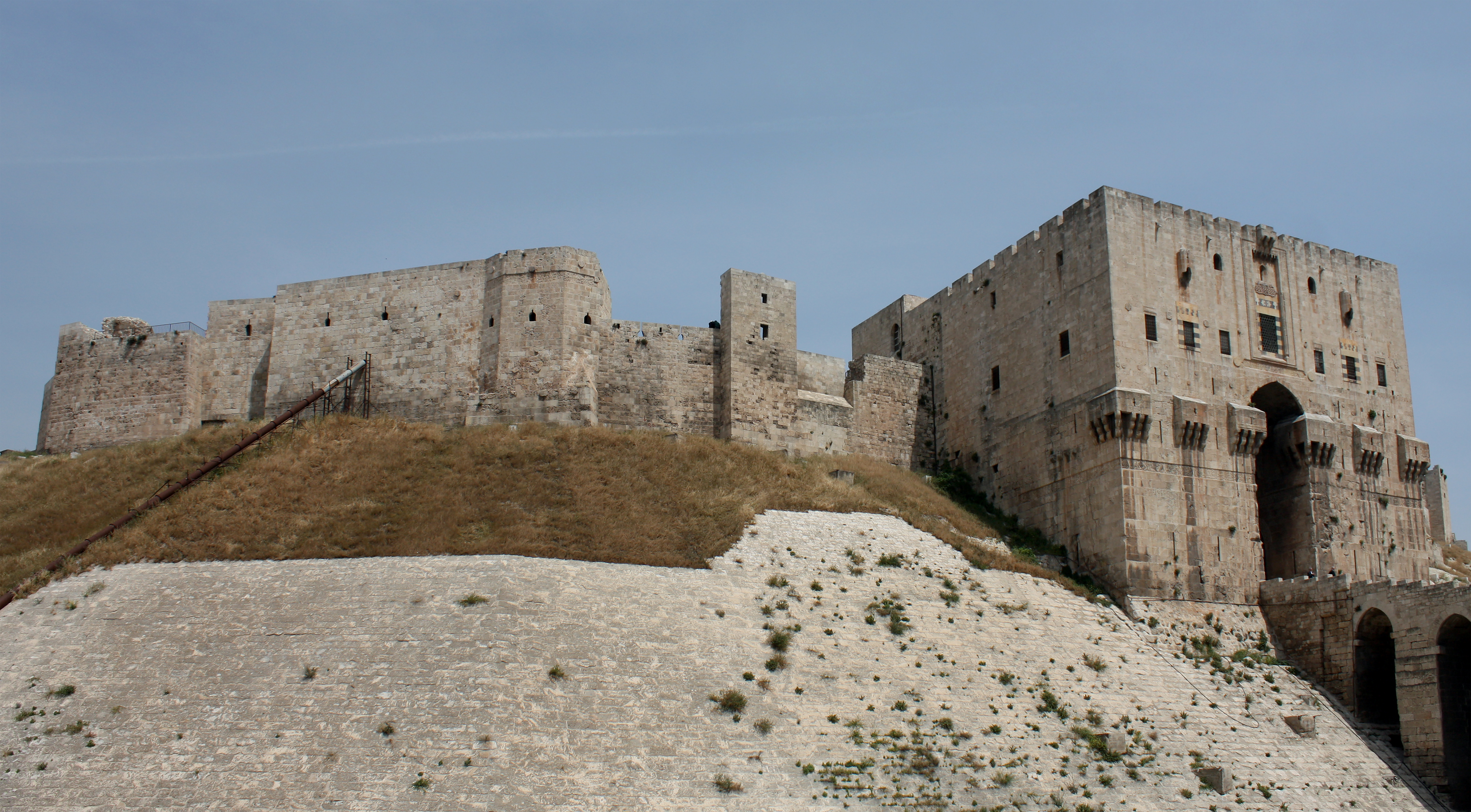
Anushtakin took refuge in the Citadel of Aleppo (pictured) after escaping Damascus. He died in the citadel and left there a treasure of 600,000 gold dinars

After a three-month stay, Anushtakin departed Aleppo for Damascus, leaving the citadel in the hands of his ghilman, Sabuktekin and Fatik, and the city under another ghulam named Banjutekin. Order and security was established countrywide by Anushtakin, in large part to ensure the Syrian population's support for his rule; no contemporary information is available about domestic conditions in Aleppo specifically during Anushtakin's governorship, but he was apparently popular with its inhabitants, according to Zakkar. Moreover, Anushtakin strengthened his political ties with the Arab tribes of northern Syria and Anatolia through marriage; he wed a daughter of the Kilab emir, Mansur ibn Zughayb, and proposed the marriage of his son to the daughter of the Marwanid emir of Mayyafariqin, Nasr ad-Dawla. Anushtakin also consolidated his military power by recruiting substantial Turkish ghilman and capturing the Euphrates River fortress of Qal'at Dawsar in 1040/41.

The extensive recruitment of ghilman irked Anushtakin's Fatimid troops in Damascus, prompting some of them to complain to al-Jarjara'i. The latter had sought a pretext to remove Anushtakin, and took advantage of the Damascene troops' dissent to conspire against him. Al-Jarjara'i told the troops of his disapproval of Anushtakin and instructed them to await notice on how to proceed while encouraging them to quietly gather support among their comrades in Syria. Soon after, al-Jarjara'i secretly ordered all Fatimid local and provincial governors in Syria to bypass Anushtakin's authority and report directly to Cairo. He then issued a letter to Thimal restoring his governorship of Aleppo, which he beckoned Thimal to capture by force. Anushtakin was unaware of the intrigues against him, and in late 1041, al-Jarjara'i intentionally provoked Anushtakin by demanding the dismissal and handover of his chief scribe (katib), Abu Sa'id. Angered, Anushtakin summoned the vizier's Damascus representative and had him beaten and humiliated. Zakkar asserts that by this action Anushtakin "actually proclaimed his independence".

In the following days, Anushtakin discontinued payments to his Fatimid troops, with the exception of those loyal to him rather than the caliph. This led to a mutiny in Damascus among the Fatimid officers who had colluded with al-Jarjara'i. Disorder spread throughout the city and Anushtakin's palace was assaulted and plundered, prompting Anushtakin to flee with 300 of his ghilman and seek safety in Ba'albek. He was refused entry into the latter and headed north to Hama, but was again denied refuge. However, the Banu Munqidh emir of Kafartab (northwest of Hama) offered him protection and safely escorted him to Aleppo, where he took refuge in the citadel. Afterward, al-Jarjara'i branded Anushtakin a traitor deserving of severe punishment for betraying al-Mustansir. According to contemporary sources, Anushtakin had been suffering from severe fatigue and was deeply disheartened by the allegations of treachery. As a result of his ailing condition, he collapsed and died in the citadel in January 1042. A month later, Thimal reestablished Mirdasid rule in the city and a governor was appointed to Damascus, thereby ending the administrative unity of Syria.

For unclear reasons, in 1057, al-Mustansir honored Anushtakin by having his body relocated from Aleppo to Jerusalem for burial; because of its religious sanctity, Jerusalem had served as a ceremonial burial place for the rulers of Syria and Egypt since the Tulunid period (9th century). A state funeral procession was held for the occasion and Fatimid officials were directed to pay honors to Anushtakin as his coffin passed through their towns on the way to Jerusalem.

== Patronage and local relations ==
During his career, Anushtakin amassed significant wealth from a number of sources. Among them were his income-producing properties in Palestine and Damascus, tax farms in Egypt, business deals with rich Damascene merchants, involvement in the Syrian maritime trade with ships that he owned and war spoils from his conquest of Aleppo. His wealth enabled him to purchase and train large numbers of Turkish ghilman. He spent substantial sums, via the Bukhara-born Hanafi qadi of Aleppo, to fund the establishment of Islamic law colleges, mosques and bridges in the Muslim lands of Transoxiana. This indicated Anushtakin's interest in his ancestral homeland and, according to al-Maqrizi, was partly meant to publicly demonstrate his transition from a slave from Central Asia to a formidable governor in Syria. As a testament to his fortune, Ibn al-Qalanisi asserted that by the time of Anushtakin's death, he had left 600,000 gold dinars and 200,000 dinars-worth of grain in the citadel of Aleppo.

Throughout his career, Anushtakin established close ties with the wulat al-atraf (chieftains of the fringes), i.e. the numerous heterodox Muslim clans who lived in the highland regions west of Damascus, Tiberias and Aleppo. According to historian Kamal Salibi, it is probable that Anushtakin's good relations with the highland chieftains "paved the way for the spread of a special cult of al-Hakim among the tribal peasants of these areas", i.e. the Druze. According to Ibn al-Qalanisi, Anushtakin "endeared himself to the notables and the common folk by showing them affection and honour in every way possible". He pursued a policy of solidifying relationships with the Bedouin tribes through marriage. To that end, he wed the daughters of Rafi ibn Abi'l Layl of Kalb, Wahb ibn Hassan of Tayy and Mansur ibn Zughayb of Kilab. His marriage ties with others among the nobility in Syria included a certain Husam ad-Dawla al-Bajnaki, whose daughter Anushtakin married, and a certain Sarim ad-Dawla Dhu'l Fadilatayini, whose son wed a daughter of Anushtakin. He had a son from his Jarrahid wife, and four daughters from his other marriages. Anushtakin also had daughters with concubines from the Fatimid court.

== Bibliography ==
- Bianquis, Thierry (1989). Damas et la Syrie sous la domination fatimide (359-468/969-1076): essai d'interprétation de chroniques arabes médiévales. Deuxième tome (in French). Damascus: Institut français de Damas. ISBN 978-2-35159131-4.
- Gil, Moshe (1997) [1983]. A History of Palestine, 634–1099. Translated by Ethel Broido. Cambridge: Cambridge University Press. ISBN 0-521-59984-9.
- Kennedy, Hugh (2004) [1986]. The Prophet and the Age of the Caliphates: The Islamic Near East from the 6th to the 11th Century (Second ed.). Harlow: Longman. ISBN 978-0-582-40525-7.
- Lev, Yaacov (1991). State and Society in Fatimid Egypt. Leiden: Brill. ISBN 90-04-09344-3.
- Lev, Yaacov (2003). "Turks in the Political and Military Life of Eleventh-Century Egypt and Syria". In Hidemitsu, Kuroki (ed.). The Influence of Human Mobility in Muslim Societies. Kegan Paul. ISBN 0710308027.
- Obeid, Anis I. (2006). The Druze & Their Faith in Tawhid. Syracuse University Press. ISBN 0815630972.
- Rustow, Marina (2008). Heresy and the Politics of Community: The Jews of the Fatimid Caliphate. Cornell University Press. p. 228. ISBN 978-0-8014-4582-8.
- Salibi, Kamal S. (1977). Syria Under Islam: Empire on Trial, 634–1097, Volume 1. Delmar: Caravan Books. ISBN 9780882060132.
- Smoor, Pieter (1985). Kings and Bedouins in the Palace of Aleppo as Reflected in Maʻarrī's Works. University of Manchester. ISBN 9780950788555.
- Zakkar, Suhayl (1971). The Emirate of Aleppo: 1004–1094. Aleppo: Dar al-Amanah.
