= Juyushi Mosque =

Mosque in Cairo, Egypt

- الجامع الجيوشى
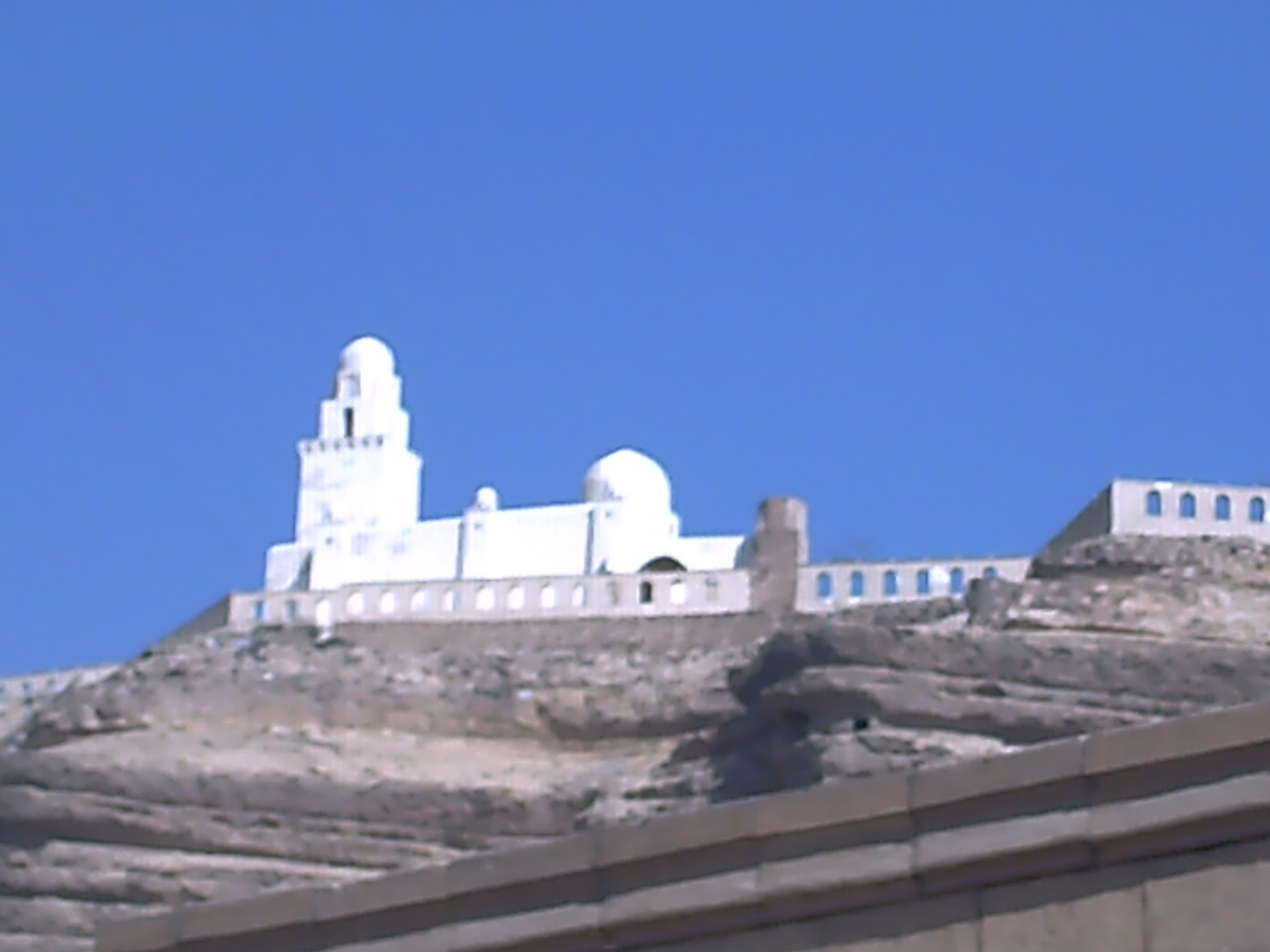

- Location within Egypt

Religion
- Affiliation: Shia Islam
- Sect: Taiyabi Ismaili
- Ecclesiastical or organisational status: Mosque and mashhad

Location
- Location: Muqattam Hills, Cairo
- Country: Egypt
- Coordinates: 30°01′19″N 31°16′07″E

Architecture
- Type: Mosque
- Style: Fatimid
- Founder: al-Mustansir Billah
- Funded by: Badr al-Jamali
- Completed: 1086 CE

Specifications
- Dome: 1
- Minaret: 1

The Juyushi Mosque (Arabic: الجامع الجيوشى, lit. 'Mosque of the Armies') is a historic monument in Cairo, Egypt. The mosque dates from 1086 CE, during the reign of the Fatimid Imam-Caliph al-Mustansir Billah. Its construction was sponsored by Badr al-Jamali, the vizier of al-Mustansir, who was Amir al-Juyush (Arabic: امير الجيوش, lit. 'Commander of the Armies'). It is located on the Muqattam hills above the Southern Cemetery of Cairo.

== Historical background ==
The building's construction is dated by an Arabic foundation inscription from 478 AH (1085/1086 CE), during the Fatimid period and the reign of al-Mustansir Billah. The inscription identifies the structure as a mashhad (Arabic: مشهد, lit. 'shrine'), meaning a commemorative shrine or mausoleum. It is not clear whom the mashhad commemorates or what its exact function was. The most plausible theory is that the monument commemorates the victories of Badr al-Jamali, the powerful Fatimid vizier whose title, Amir al-Juyush ("Commander of the Armies"), is invoked in the foundation inscription. Badr al-Jamali himself was not buried here, but rather in a tomb outside Bab al-Nasr, according to al-Maqrizi. The structure's isolated setting on the Muqattam hills above Cairo is also unusual and has even led to one scholarly theory suggesting it was actually a watchtower disguised as a mosque.

In 1731–2, during the Ottoman period, the building was restored and some painted decoration was added to the interior. In the 1990s the mosque underwent a major renovation organized and funded by the Dawoodi Bohra community, who restored several other Fatimid-era mosques in Cairo around this time. Some historical details, including Ottoman decoration, were eliminated during the restoration. As of 2018, the mosque was situated inside a military zone and was not open to visitors without special permission.

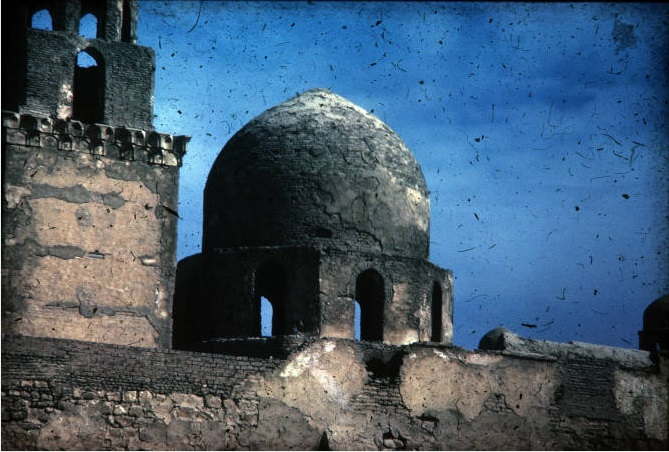
Exterior of the mosque before restoration

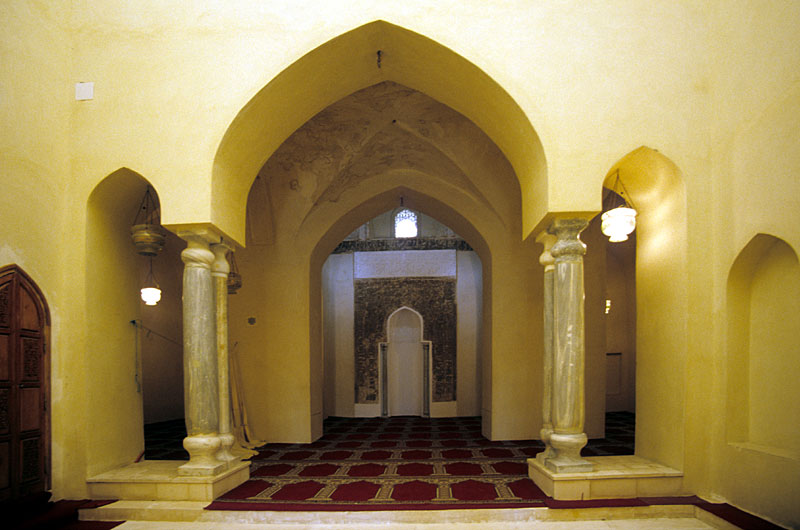
Interior of the mosque after restoration

== Architecture ==
=== General ===
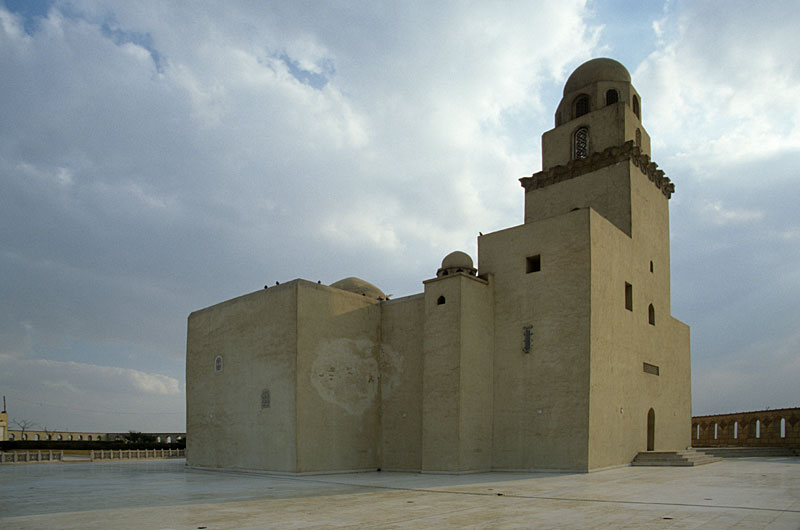
Exterior of the mosque, with the minaret rising on the right

The building, often described as a mosque, is the most complete mashhad (commemorative shrine) to survive from the Fatimid period. It is centered around a small courtyard, which is entered from the outside through a plain door and passage. On one side of the courtyard is the prayer hall or sanctuary, while opposite this, standing on the central axis of the building, is a minaret. On the other two sides of the courtyard are rooms, as well as a passage leading to a small domed room projecting from the rest of the building. Small rooms also flank the minaret.

The prayer hall is entered from the courtyard via a large keel arch flanked by two smaller arches with supporting columns, an arrangement that recurs in Fatimid architecture. Beyond this is a rectangular space covered by cross-vaults, followed by a roughly square area covered by a dome, flanked by two more spaces each covered by a cross-vault. The dome rests on an octagonal base with four plain squinches.

The mihrab (niche symbolizing the qibla) is covered in elaborate stucco decoration. The conch or semi-dome section of the mihrab once contained 18th-century painted decoration from the Ottoman period, but this decoration was destroyed during the modern Bohra restoration. Stucco decoration also exists in the form of a medallion inscription at the summit of the dome and an inscription band around the top of the chamber below the dome.

The minaret has a similar design to that of the Great Mosque of Kairouan and it is also the earliest example in Egypt of a minaret with multiple tiers of different designs. It is composed of a large rectangular (or cuboid) section, above which is a smaller square section that is topped by a dome with the same profile as the semi-dome of the mihrab. Along the top of the minaret's first rectangular portion is a cornice of muqarnas (stalactite-like sculpting) which is the earliest surviving example of this type of decoration in Egypt.

=== Inscriptions ===
Over the entrance there is an inscription which begins with Qur'anic verses 72:18 and 9:108; translated into English as:

And the places of worship are for God, so invoke not any one along with God.

Never stand thou forth therein. There is a mosque whose foundation was laid from the first day on piety; it is more worthy of the standing forth therein. In it are men who love to be purified; and God loves those who make themselves pure.

The inscription further continues:

The construction of this blessed martyrium [mashhad] was ordered by the servant of our lord and master Imam al-Mustansir billah, Commander of the Believers, may the blessings of God be upon him and upon his forefathers, the pure imams, and upon his most magnanimous descendants and peace until the Day of Judgment - the most illustrious lord commander of the armies, sword of Islam, helper of the imam, surety of the judges of the Muslims and guide to the propagandists of the believers - may God strengthen through him the religion, and give pleasure to the Commander of the Believers by the length of his stay, and make his power lasting and make his word prevail and deceive his enemies and those envious of him as he seeks the good pleasure of God, in the month of Muharram 478 [1085 CE].

The mihrab is decorated with an inscription of Qur'anic verses that begins outside the mihrab niche and finishes inside it. The first verse is 24:11, followed by 24:36 and the beginning of 24:37, and finishing with verse 10:23 inside the mihrab; translated into English as:

Those who come with the slander are a band of you; do not reckon it evil for you; rather it is good for you. Every man of them shall have the sin that he has earned charged to him; and whosoever of them took upon himself the greater part of it, him there awaits a mighty chastisement.

In temples [buyut] God has allowed to be raised up, and His Name to be commemorated therein; therein glorifying Him, in the mornings and the evenings, are men whom neither commerce nor trafficking diverts from the remembrance of God and to perform the prayer, and to pay the alms, fearing a day when hearts and eyes shall be turned about.

Nevertheless when He has delivered them behold, they are insolent in the earth, wrongfully. O men, your insolence is only against yourselves; the enjoyment of this present life, then unto Us you shall return, then We shall tell you what you were doing.

Around the dome's base is an inscription of verses 48:1-5; translated into English as:

Surely We have given thee a manifest victory, that God may forgive thee thy former and thy latter sins, and complete His blessing upon thee, and guide thee on a straight path, and that God may help thee with mighty help. It is He who sent down the Sakina [holiness of God] into the hearts of the believers, that they might add faith to their faith – to God belong the hosts of the heavens and the earth; God is All-knowing, All-wise – and that He may admit the believers, men and women alike, into gardens underneath which rivers flow, therein to dwell forever, and acquit them of their evil deeds; that is in God's sight a mighty triumph.

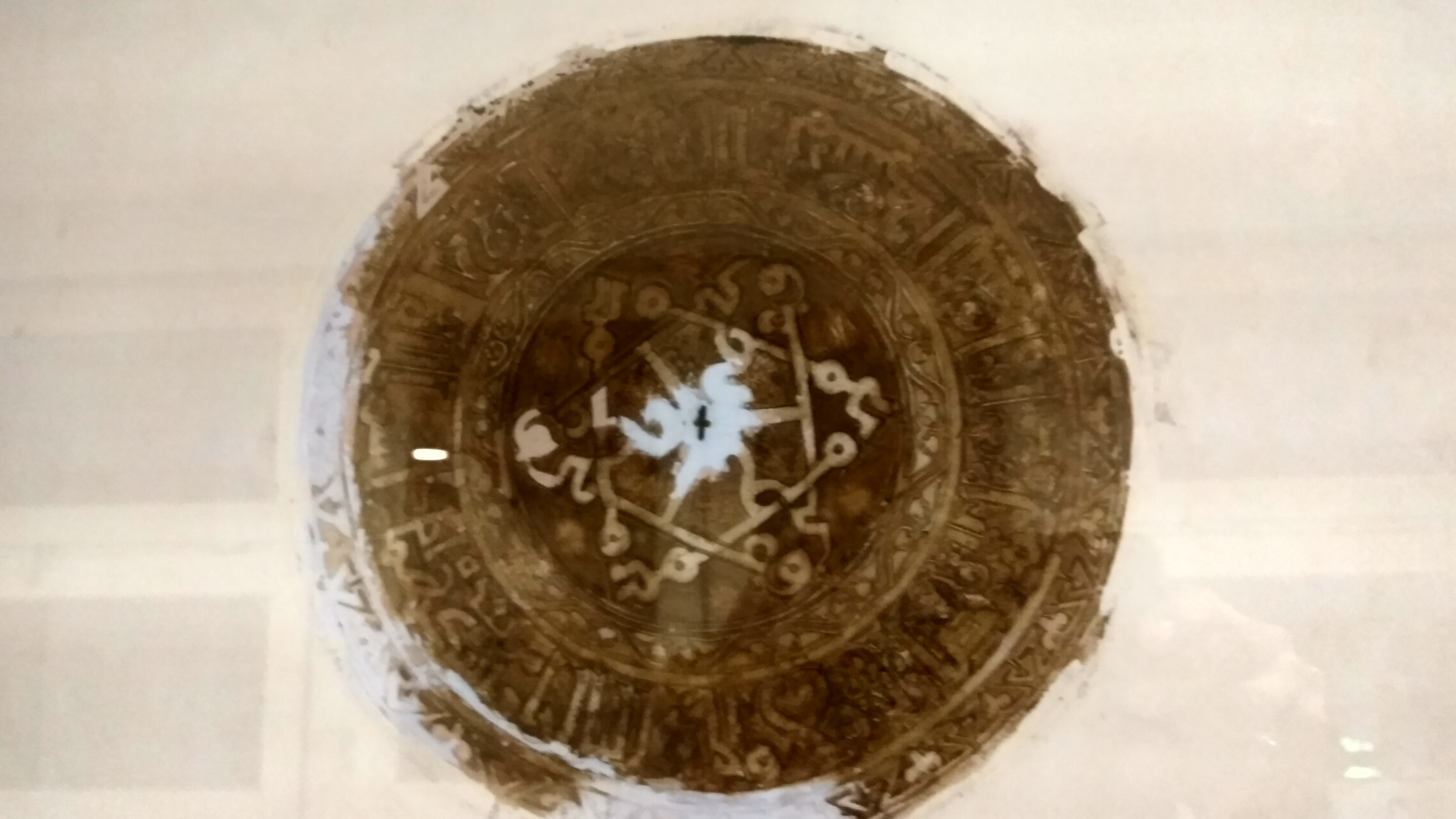
Inscription at the summit of dome

At the summit of the dome is a carved medallion with a six-pointed star formed by the words Muhammad and Ali each repeated three times. Around the star is inscribed verse 35:39; translated into English as:

It is He who appointed you viceroys in the earth. So whoever disbelieves, his unbelief shall be charged against him; their unbelief increases the disbelievers only in hate in God's sight; their unbelief increases the disbelievers only in loss.

== See also ==
- Shia Islam in Egypt
- List of mosques in Cairo
- List of mosques in Egypt
