= Rafi ibn Abi'l-Layl =

Rāfiʿ ibn Abīʾl-Layl ibn ʿUlayyān al-Kalbī (Arabic: رافع بن أبي ليلى بن عليان الكلبي) (fl. 1028–1038), also known by his laqab (honorific epithet) ʿIzz al-Dawla (Arabic: عزالدولة), was the emir of the Kalb tribe of Syria in the mid-11th century.

== Life ==
Rafi succeeded his uncle, Sinan ibn Ulayyan, as emir of the Kalb after the latter's death in 1028. Sinan had entered the Kalb into an alliance against the Fatimid Caliphate with two other Bedouin tribal confederations, the Tayy under Hassan ibn Mufarrij and the Kilab under Salih ibn Mirdas. However, under Rafi, the Kalb defected to the Fatimids. This occurred after Rafi' declared his loyalty to Caliph az-Zahir (r. 1021–1036) in return for control of Sinan's iqtaʿat (fiefs). When the Fatimids dispatched Anushtakin al-Dizbari to confront the Tayy and Kilab, Rafi and the Kalb fought alongside him at the decisive Battle of al-Uqhuwana near Lake Tiberias. After the battle, during which Salih was slain, Rafi' identified his body and that of his son, decapitated them and sent their heads to Anushtakin. The Kalb under Rafi later participated in Anushtakin's campaign against Salih's successor, Shibl al-Dawla Nasr, in 1038, which ended in Nasr's slaying and the Fatimids' recapture of Aleppo.

== Druze tradition ==
Rafi is considered a hero in the Druze tradition for fighting Salih ibn Mirdas and using his wealth to protect and support the Druze in Syria. The Druze missionary Baha al-Din praised Rafi for protecting the oppressed in an epistle to Arab tribal chiefs in 1031. He later became considered a saintly figure of the Druze.

== Bibliography ==
- Abu-Izzeddin, Nejla M. (1993). The Druzes: A New Study of Their History, Faith, and Society. Leiden and Boston: E. J. Brill. ISBN 90-04-09705-8.
- Gil, Moshe (1997) [1983]. A History of Palestine, 634–1099. Translated by Ethel Broido. Cambridge: Cambridge University Press. ISBN 0-521-59984-9.
- Cappel, Andrew J. (1994). "The Byzantine Response to the 'Arab (10th–11th Centuries)". In Dyck, Andrew Roy; Takács, Sarolta A. (eds.). Presence of Byzantium: Studies Presented to Milton V. Anastos in Honor of His Eighty-fifth Birthday. Amsterdam: Adolf M. Hakkert. pp. 113–. ISBN 90-256-0619-9.
- Lev, Yaacov (2003). "Turks in the Political and Military Life of Eleventh-Century Egypt and Syria". In Hidemitsu, Kuroki (ed.). The Influence of Human Mobility in Muslim Societies. Kegan Paul. ISBN 0710308027.
- Swayd, Sami (2006). The A to Z of the Druzes. Scarecrow Press. p. 85. ISBN 9780810868366.
