= Rasad =

Consort of Ali az-Zahir

- Born: Unknown date
- Died: after 1078; Cairo, Egypt
- Consort of: Al-Zahir li-i'zaz Din Allah
- Children: Al-Mustansir Billah
Names
- Malika Rasad Umm Ma'ad

Rasad (Arabic: رصد, lit. 'Talisman'; fl. 1044–1078) was a slave concubine who, as the queen-mother of the Fatimid caliph al-Mustansir Billah, became the virtual regent of Egypt between 1044 and 1071. The name Rasad literally means "observed".

== Life ==
Rasad was of Sub-Saharan African origin. Described as being Sudanese, she first entered the fatimid harem of Fatimid caliph Ali az-Zahir of Egypt as a concubine. The ruler had purchased her from Abu Sa'd al-Tustari, a Jewish merchant.

Rasad soon became her husband's favourite, and was later given the title malika, often translated as queen, signifying that she was formally a part of the royal family rather than a slave concubine. When she later gave birth to a son that they named al-Mustansir Billah, a delighted az-Zahir declared that the young prince would succeed to the Fatimid throne upon his own demise. When she gave birth to a child acknowledged by her enslaver as his, she became an um-walad, which meant that she automatically became manumitted upon the death of her enslaver.

=== De facto ruler ===
In 1036, her son al-Mustansir ascended the throne of Egypt in his seventh year. Formally, Egypt was ruled by the vizier Ali ibn Ahmad al-Jarjara'i during the minority of al-Mustansir; Rasad was never formally regent, but as the mother of the Caliph (equivalent to a queen mother), she had an enormous deal of informal influence.

When al-Jarjara'i died in 1044, Rasad established her own diwan and appointed her previous owner Abu Sa'd al-Tustari as its head. With the blessing of her passive son, she effectively ruled the state by influencing the appointment of favourites to posts and offices, and it was said that she was the ruler of her son and that her diwan was the 'gate to power' of the state. The vizier al-Falahi was nominally in charge, but he held virtually no real power - Rasad and al-Tustari were the ones who were really in charge. Rasad played al-Tustari and al-Falahi against each other. In 1047, the jealous al-Falahi collaborated with Turkish elements in the army to have al-Tustari assassinated. Rasad had al-Fallahi arrested and executed the following year. She briefly appointed al-Tustari's brother Abu Nasr to oversee management of her diwan.

Al-Tustari's specific assassin, however, could not be identified, and al-Mustansir did not want to punish a large number of Turkish soldiers. So in order to counterbalance the Turkish influence, Rasad brought in an influx of black slave soldiers and compelled state officials to buy them. When the vizier al-Husayn al-Jarjara'i objected to this policy in 1050, Rasad had him dismissed and replaced with Abu Muhammad al-Yazuri, who had been the head of her diwan. Al-Yazuri "was keen to implement her policy and vision". He served in parallel as the head of her diwan as well as the vizier of her son until 1058. According to Ibn al-Sairafi and al-Maqrizi, the number of black slave soldiers exceeded 50,000 at its peak.

Serious famine struck Egypt in 1054. The Fatimids negotiated with the Byzantine Empress Theodora to get food supplies into the country. They also discussed a possible military alliance, since they shared a common enemy in the Mirdasids of northern Syria. According to Taef El-Azhari, Rasad may have been a leading actor in these negotiations, especially since she had already exchanged gifts with Theodora before.

Rasad was waited upon by 5,000 slaves, endowed valuable philanthropies, and underwrote a building campaign. She championed the cause of her black soldiers - most of whom were her countrymen - in their ongoing struggle for supremacy against their Turkish rivals in the royal army. The battle of wills between the two halves of the army eventually degenerated into open warfare in 1062, and a prolonged drought that then hit Egypt only exacerbated the situation. The Turks soon claimed victory, and in recompense for the Caliph and the Caliph mother both having supported the blacks, the latter was arrested and stripped of her property. For his part, al-Mustansir was strong-armed into bribing his own soldiers to stand down by emptying his treasury.

=== Later life ===
In 1067 or 1069, after the Turkish soldiers' victory, Rasad fled to Baghdad along with al-Mustansir's daughters. (Note: This is according to Ibn Khallikan and Ibn Taghribirdi.) Although this account is disputed, Rasad's power was reduced and she is rarely mentioned in chronicles afterward.

In 1074, Caliph al-Mustansir was able to restore order with the help of Badr al-Jamali and his army of Syrian mercenaries. Al-Jamali, who had also once been a slave, was made the vizier thereafter in 1074. This was the effective end of Rasad's long de facto rule, though she continued to serve as a royal diplomat for the remainder of her life. She is mentioned in 1078, when performing a diplomatic correspondence with queen Arwa al-Sulayhi of Yemen. Arwa's initial letter to the Fatimids has not survived, but Rasad's response has. It is her only known official correspondence with another queen, and it is the only instance where Rasad is known to have called herself a queen (malika). (Note: For unknown reasons, medieval chroniclers never used this title to describe her.)

== Descendants ==
Through the various kings of both the Fatimid dynasty and its cadet families that have ruled following al-Mustansir's death in 1094, Rasad's bloodline has come down to the present day. For example, the Aga Khans - a dynasty of mixed Persian/European ancestry that is currently led by the Aga Khan V, Imam of the Nizari Ismailis - claim direct descent from Rasad through al-Mustansir.

== Sources ==
- Cortese, Delia; Calderini, Simonetta (2006). Women and the Fatimids in the World of Islam. Edinburgh: Edinburgh University Press. ISBN 0-7486-1733-7.
- El-Azhari, Taef (2019). Queens, Eunuchs, and Concubines in Islamic History, 661-1257. Edinburgh: Edinburgh University Press. ISBN 978-1-4744-2319-9.
- Halm, Heinz (2003). Die Kalifen von Kairo: Die Fatimiden in Ägypten, 973–1074 [The Caliphs of Cairo: The Fatimids in Egypt, 973–1074] (in German). Munich: C. H. Beck. ISBN 3-406-48654-1.
- Halm, Heinz (2015). "Prinzen, Prinzessinnen, Konkubinen und Eunuchen am fatimidischen Hof" [Princes, Princesses, Concubines and Eunuchs at the Fatimid Court]. In Pomerantz, Maurice A.; Shahin, Aram A. (eds.). The Heritage of Arabo-Islamic Learning. Studies Presented to Wadad Kadi (in German). Leiden and Boston: Brill. pp. 91–110. ISBN 978-90-04-30590-8.
