= Mustansirite Hardship =

1064–1071 crisis and famine in Egypt

The Mustansirite Hardship (Arabic: الشِّدَّةُ المُسْتَنْصِرِيَّة, romanized: ash-Shiddatu l-Mustanṣiriyya) was a political crisis in Fatimid Egypt which resulted in a seven-year famine that occurred between 1064 and 1071 CE. Around 40,000 people are estimated to have starved to death during that period. The crisis occurred during the reign of Caliph al-Mustansir Billah, after whom it is named.

== Causes ==
For several years before the crisis, the Nile failed to flood as was required for crop irrigation, which lowered agricultural outputs. In 1066, a quarrel between Turkish Mamluk slave-mercenaries and Sudanese slave-mercenaries escalated into a full-blown civil war, with both sides vying for control over the weak Caliph al-Mustansir. (Note: Much like eunuchs in East Asia, some slaves exerted political and court influence in state affairs during this period of Egyptian history.) The Caliph's mother, being an African slave-concubine herself, used her influence in favor of the African faction. The Turks were led by the general Nasir al-Dawla ibn Hamdan. Military engagement between the Turkish and African factions, including a siege of Cairo, led to further food shortages. Eventually, Nasir al-Dawla was able to rout the African forces and thus took control of the viziership of Egypt.

== Famine ==
A market run on wheat and bread caused rapid inflation and the complete depletion of Fatimid state coffers. Soon enough, food became too expensive, if not unobtainable, for the average Egyptian. The 14th-century Egyptian historian al-Maqrizi relates some of the desperate measures taken by the starving masses during this time—cannibalism became commonplace, and some even resorted to kidnapping passersby by use of hooks dangled from the roof of buildings, upon which the kidnappers would eat the victim. The corpses of executed criminals were also eaten. Dogs were sold at 5 silver dirhams each, which eventually caused a shortage of dogs. Al-Maqrizi also relates the story of a woman who had strips of flesh cut from her thighs by hungry kidnappers. Several cities were completely depopulated as a result of the famine, including al-Askar and al-Qata'i, and other cities such as Fustat saw the majority of their populations perish.

Some Arab historians likened this famine to Egypt's seven-year famine described in Judeo-Christian and Islamic tradition.
