= Al-Hasan ibn Salih al-Rudhabari =

al-Hasan ibn Salih al-Rudhabari
- الحسن بن صالح الرُّضْبَارِي

Vizier of the Fatimid Caliphate

ʿAmīd al-Dawla (Provost of the State)
- In office 1024–1027
- Preceded by: Shams al-Mulk Abuʾl-Fath Tahir ibn Wazzan
- Succeeded by: Ali al-Jarjara’i

Personal details
- Known for: Recalling the soldier-governor Anushtakin al-Dizbari to restore control in Palestine

Abū Muḥammad al-Ḥasan ibn Ṣāliḥ al-Rūdhabārī (also transliterated as al-Rūzbārī or al-Rūdpārī), also known by his title ʿAmid al-Dawla, was the vizier of the Fatimid Caliphate in 1024–1027, during the reign of Caliph al-Zahir.

== Origins ==
Al-Rudhabari was an obscure figure, not mentioned in one of the chief sources of his era in office, al-Musabbihi, while another contemporary chronicler confuses him for his father. He belonged to a family of Persian origin, whose members served as political and military officials in Egypt under the Ikhshidids and continued under the Fatimids. Many members were also chroniclers. His father, Abu'l-Fada'il Salih ibn Ali, was a military official under the Fatimid governor Manjutakin in northern Syria. His father was appointed as wasita, a position lower ranking than vizier which placed him as an intermediary between the caliph and his diwan (administration). He was executed on the orders of Caliph al-Hakim (r. 996–1021) in 1009.

== Career ==
Al-Rudhabari served as the administrator of Ramla, the capital of Palestine, during the reign of Caliph al-Aziz (r. 975–996). Under al-Hakim he served as the governor of Damascus, and afterward was appointed head of the diwan al-jaysh (army register).

In 1024, during the reign of Caliph al-Zahir (r. 1021–1036), and under the general direction of the diwan, al-Rudhabari was appointed to replace the vizier Shams al-Mulk Abu'l-Fath Tahir ibn Wazzan. He was an elderly man at the time of his appointment, with considerable administrative skills. According to the chronicler Ibn al-Sayrafi, al-Zahir was abusive toward al-Rudhabari, had little regard for his age and seniority, and dismissed and reinstated him in his post. Among al-Rudhabari's actions in office was recalling the military governor of Palestine, Anushtakin al-Dizbari, after it was overrun by the Bedouin Jarrahids. Al-Rudhabari was dismissed by the caliph in 1027 and replaced by Ali al-Jarjara'i.

== Bibliography ==
- Al-Imad, Leila S. (1990). The Fatimid Vizierate, 969-1172. Berlin: K. Schwarz. ISBN 3-922968-82-1.
- Bianquis, Thierry (1989). Damas et la Syrie sous la domination fatimide (359-468/969-1076): essai d'interprétation de chroniques arabes médiévales. Deuxième tome (in French). Damascus: Institut français de Damas. ISBN 978-2-35159131-4.
- Brett, Michael (2017). The Fatimid Empire. Edinburgh: Edinburgh University Press. ISBN 978-0-7486-4077-5.
- Lev, Yaacov (2003). "Turks in the Political and Military Life of Eleventh-Century Egypt and Syria". In Hidemitsu, Kuroki (ed.). The Influence of Human Mobility in Muslim Societies. Kegan Paul. ISBN 0710308027.

Preceded by Abu'l-Fath al-Mas'ud ibn Tahir al-Wazzan	Vizier of the Fatimid Caliphate; 1024–1027	Succeeded by Ali ibn Ahmad al-Jarjara'i
