= Al-Awhad (son of Badr al-Jamali) =

Al-Awhad (Arabic: الاوحد, lit. 'the Unique One, the Unparalleled One') was the eldest son of the Fatimid vizier and quasi-sultan, Badr al-Jamali (r. 1074–1094). When his father left Acre in 1073 to take power in Egypt, al-Awhad with his mother and siblings were left behind in the city, which shortly after fell to a Turkoman chieftain, Şöglü. While the Turkoman ruler of Damascus, Atsiz ibn Uwaq, demanded their handover, Şöglü, aiming to secure Badr's favour in his rivalry with Atsiz, eventually sent them to Egypt. Soon after his arrival in Egypt, al-Awhad was appointed governor of Alexandria, being in office by 1076.

Removed from his father's court in Cairo, al-Awhad fell under the influence of an officer whose relatives had been killed during Badr's purges while the latter consolidated his power over Egypt. Al-Awhad's behaviour awoke his father's distrust, and envoys, including his half-brother al-Afdal, were sent to Alexandria to persuade him to change his stance. These attempts failed, leading to the siege of Alexandria by Badr's forces in spring 1084. The city capitulated and al-Awhad surrendered to his father, who took him with him to Cairo. Badr also appointed his younger son al-Afdal in al-Awhad's place as heir apparent. Soon new rumours reached Badr that al-Awhad was conspiring to assassinate him; al-Awhad was imprisoned and the rest of his co-conspirators executed. Finally, on 29 August 1087 al-Awhad was executed by strangulation, possibly to prevent another plot that aimed to liberate him.

== Sources ==
- Halm, Heinz (2014). Kalifen und Assassinen: Ägypten und der vordere Orient zur Zeit der ersten Kreuzzüge, 1074–1171 [Caliphs and Assassins: Egypt and the Near East at the Time of the First Crusades, 1074–1171] (in German). Munich: C. H. Beck. doi:10.17104/9783406661648-1. ISBN 978-3-406-66163-1. OCLC 870587158.
