= Gibelacar =

Archaeological site in Lebanon

Gibelacar (Hisn Ibn Akkar)
- Akkar District, Akkar Governorate, Lebanon

Site information
- Condition: Ruined

Location
- Location within Lebanon
- Coordinates: 34.5250°N 36.2417°E

Site history
- Built: ca. 1000 (first construction)
- Built by: Muhriz ibn Akkar (first construction)

Gibelacar (Arabic: جبل عكار), also known by its original Arabic name Hisn Ibn Akkar (Arabic: حصن ابن عكار) or its modern Arabic name Qal'at Akkar (Arabic: قلعة عكار), is a fortress in the village of Akkar al-Atiqa in the Akkar Governorate in northern Lebanon. The fortress dates back to the Fatimid era in the early 11th century. It was captured and utilized by the Crusaders in the early 12th century until it was captured and strengthened by the Mamluks in the late 13th century. It became the headquarters of the Sayfa clan, whose members, chief among them Yusuf Pasha, served as the governors and tax farmers of the Tripoli Eyalet and its sanjaks from 1579 through the mid-17th century.

== Location ==
Gibelacar is located in Jabal Akkar, the northernmost slopes of the Mount Lebanon range. It is 27 kilometers south of the Krak des Chevaliers in Syria, at the opposite end of the Homs Gap. Gibelacar is situated on a narrow ridge formed by the two ravines of the Nahr Akkar stream. Though largely ruined, the remains of the fortress extend the entire length of the 200-meter ridge. Its tower, which stands at the southern end of the ridge, is still well-preserved. The site has an elevation of 700 meters above sea level and has a commanding view over the mountain road leading to the fortress.

== History ==
=== Arab origins ===
Gibelacar was referred to by the Arabs as Ḥiṣn Ibn ʿAkkār. The fortress secured the Hims–Tripoli Gap and overlooked the northernmost slopes of Mount Lebanon. According to Arabic sources, the fortress's namesake and founder was Muhriz ibn Akkar, who built it in c. 1000. Hisn Ibn Akkar remained in the hands of Muhriz's family until 1019. Later, during a rebellion against the Fatimid Caliphate in 1024, it was captured by Salih ibn Mirdas, the preeminent chieftain of the Banu Kilab tribe and founder of the Mirdasid dynasty. Fatimid authority was restored in 1033 when the governor of Tripoli seized the fortress from the Mirdasids. This came after the Fatimid army defeated the Kilab and killed Salih at the Battle of al-Uqhuwana in May 1029. The Seljuk ruler of Damascus, Tutush I, captured the fortress in 1094.

=== Crusader control and constructions ===
By the time of the Crusader invasion of Tripoli's countryside in the early 12th century, Hisn Ibn Akkar was in the hands of Tughtakin, the Burid ruler of Damascus. The Crusaders conquered Tripoli in 1109 and were poised to capture the important fortress of Rafaniyya (Raphanea) to the north of Hisn Ibn Akkar. To prevent this, Tughtakin made an agreement with the Crusaders, giving them Hisn Ibn Akkar in exchange for desisting from attacking Rafaniyya. Nearby Hisn al-Akrad (known by Crusaders as Krak des Chevaliers) was made to pay tribute to the Crusaders, but the latter nonetheless seized the fortress in 1110. Hisn Ibn Akkar was called Guibelacard by the Crusaders as early as 1143, but was officially renamed Gibelacar in an 1170 edict. For much of the first half of the 12th century, Gibelacar was controlled by the Puylaurens, a large baronial family of the County of Tripoli. The fortress served as the family's feudal seat until circa 1167, when it was captured by the Zengid lord Nur ad-Din.

In January 1169 or between December 1169 and January 1170, the Crusaders recaptured Gibelacar and imprisoned its Zengid governor Qutlug al-Alamdar. The County of Tripoli was then held in regency by King Amalric I of Jerusalem while its count Raymond III of Tripoli was held captive by Zengid forces. The fortress was destroyed in a massive earthquake that began on 29 June 1170 and whose after shocks lasted until 24 July. Afterward, King Amalric assigned control of Gibelacar to the Knights Hospitallers with instructions to restore its fortifications. However, this assignment may not have been official as contemporary court records indicate Gibelacar was still directly under the jurisdiction of the County of Tripoli.

At the beginning of the 13th century, control of Gibelacar passed to the Crusader lord of Nephin, Raynouard III, who acquired it as a result of his marriage in 1203/04 to an Isabelle, daughter of Gibelacar's previous lord, a certain Astafort. Raynouard's control was confirmed by Raymond III, who had since been restored as the count of Tripoli. However, because the transfer was done without the approval of Raynouard's lord, Bohemond IV of Antioch, the latter opposed the move and a civil war ensued. Bohemond razed Nephin, captured Raynouard and released him in exchange for handing over Gibelacar in 1205. Raynouard subsequently left for Cyprus, where he died.

=== Mamluk capture ===
The fortress remained in the hands of Bohemond IV's royal successors until the Mamluk sultan Baybars wrested control of it soon after capturing the Krak des Chevaliers on 8 April 1271. Baybars personally commanded the march toward Gibelacar on 28 April and experienced great difficulty in transporting his siege engines through the mountainous forests surrounding the fortress. The Mamluks' bombardment commenced on 2 May and during the fighting, a Mamluk emir, Rukn al-Din al-Mankurus al-Dawadari, was killed by a Crusader projectile while praying. By 4 May the defenders were virtually defeated, but held out until surrendering on 11 May in exchange for safe passage to Tripoli. Baybars had his signature leopard emblem sculpted on a frieze on Gibelacar's main tower.

=== Headquarters of the Sayfa clan ===
In the 1520s Yusuf Sayfa, an Ottoman levend (irregular soldier) of Turkmen origins, or his family, established themselves in Hisn Ibn Akkar, which had become the fortified center of its own village by then. From there the family became a local power, subordinate first to the Shu'aybs, lords of Arqa, and later the Assafs, Turkmen lords of Ghazir. In 1579 Yusuf was appointed governor of a new eyalet (province) centered in Tripoli and grew increasingly independent of the Assafs. In addition to his lack of a strong local following in the area of the type possessed by the long-established Assafs and his intimate familiarity with the local chieftains, Yusuf was also appointed because of the relative ease of access of his Hisn Ibn Akkar stronghold from the major cities of the Syrian interior through the Homs Gap; the Ottomans would thus have the ability to intervene against Yusuf or his family in case they became recalcitrant, unlike other local chiefs whose strongholds were nestled deep in the Mount Lebanon range. Hisn Ibn Akkar was one of several targets of an Ottoman imperial expedition in 1585. The assault was led by Yusuf's replacement as governor of Tripoli, Ja'far Pasha. Afterward, the Sayfas became once again fiscally subordinate to the Assafs until Yusuf had the last Assaf chieftain Muhammad assassinated in 1590.

== See also ==
- List of Crusader castles

== Bibliography ==
- Abu-Husayn, Abdul-Rahim (1985). Provincial Leaderships in Syria, 1575-1650. Beirut: American University of Beirut.
- Deschamps, Paul (1973). Les châteaux des Croisés en terre sainte III: la défense du comté de Tripoli et de la principauté d'Antioche (in French). Paris: Librairie Orientaliste Paul Geuthner.
- Kennedy, Hugh (1994). Crusader Castles. Cambridge University Press. p. 67. ISBN 0-521-79913-9.
- Salibi, Kamal S. (February 1973). "The Sayfās and the Eyalet of Tripoli 1579-1640". Arabica. 20 (1): 25–52. JSTOR 4056003.
