= Ali ibn Ahmad al-Jarjara'i =

Fatimid vizir

Ali ibn Ahmad al-Jarjara’i

Fatimid vizier
- In office 1027 – 27 March 1045
- Succeeded by: Sadaqah ibn Yusuf al-Falahi and Abu Sa'd al-Tustari

Personal details
- Born: Jarjaraya (south of Baghdad), Iraq
- Died: 27 March 1045

Abu’l-Qāsim ʿAlī ibn Aḥmad al-Jarjarāʾī was a Fatimid official of Iraqi origin, who served as the Fatimid vizier from 1027 until his death on 27 March 1045.

As his nisba shows, he came from the locality of Jarjaraya, south of Baghdad. He came to Egypt along with his brother Abu'l-Barakat al-Husayn al-Jarjara'i, and held a succession of offices in the Fatimid bureaucracy. He entered the service of Sitt al-Mulk, before becoming secretary to the police chief of Cairo. He was convicted of disloyalty when he opened letters of the secret services in 1013, as a result of which his hands were cut off. However the Caliph al-Hakim soon regretted this harsh punishment, and took him back into the palace and promoted him to high office.

In 1015/6 he was appointed head of the dīwān al-nafaḳāt (bureau of expenditure), before rising to the post of wāsiṭa (the official intermediary between Caliph and the people) in 1021/2, and finally achieving the post of vizier in 1027. He held the post under the caliphs Ali az-Zahir and al-Mustansir until his death in March 1045.

During his tenure, after the pacification of Syria by Anushtakin al-Dizbari, al-Jarjara'i, concerned himself with improving relations with the Byzantine Empire. A ceasefire had been in place since 1027, and after fresh fighting in 1036 a peace treaty was agreed. The main point of contention was the suzerainty over the Emirate of the Mirdasids in Aleppo, which both powers made claim to. In practice a kind of dual control came into operation.

Al-Jarjara'i assumed the regency during Caliph al-Mustansir's early reign, though his rule was moderated for its duration by the influence of the caliph's powerful mother Rasad.

== Sources ==
- al-Imad, Leila S. (1990). The Fatimid Vizierate (979-1172). Berlin: Klaus Schwarz Verlag. ISBN 3-922968-82-1.
- Sourdel, Dominique (1965). "al-D̲j̲ard̲j̲arāʾī". In Lewis, B.; Pellat, Ch. & Schacht, J. (eds.). The Encyclopaedia of Islam, Second Edition. Volume II: C–G. Leiden: E. J. Brill. pp. 461–462. OCLC 495469475.

Preceded by al-Hasan ibn Salih al-Ruzbari	Vizier of the Fatimid Caliphate; 1027–1045	Succeeded by Sadaqah ibn Yusuf al-Falahi and Abu Sa'd al-Tustari
