= Shibl al-Dawla Nasr =

Emir of Aleppo from 1029 to 1038

Nasr ibn Salih
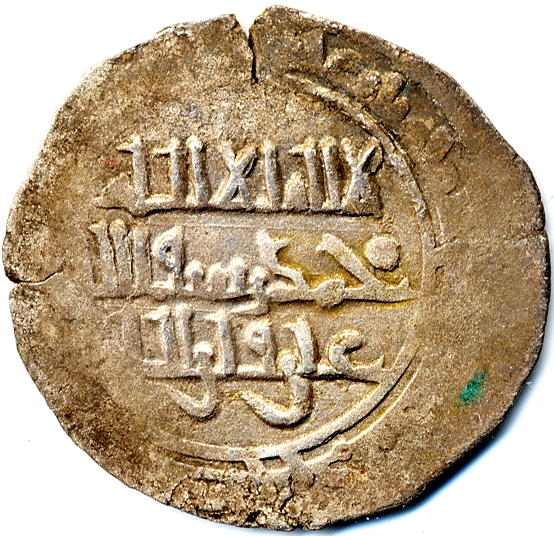
- A silver dirham of Nasr ibn Salih, minted in Aleppo in 1033/34

Emir of Aleppo
- Reign: May 1029 – 22 May 1038 (jointly with Thimal ibn Salih in May 1029 – mid-1030)
- Predecessor: Salih ibn Mirdas
- Successor: Thimal ibn Salih
- Died: 22 May 1038; Tell Fas (near Latmin)
- Spouse: Al-Sayyida Alawiyya bint Waththab
- Issue: Mahmud
Names
- Abū Kāmil Naṣr ibn Ṣāliḥ ibn Mirdās
Regnal name
- Shibl al-Dawla
- Tribe: Banu Kilab
- Dynasty: Mirdasid
- Father: Salih ibn Mirdas
- Religion: Shia Islam

Abu Kamil Nasr ibn Salih ibn Mirdas (Arabic: نصر بن صالح بن مرداس, romanized: Abū Kāmil Naṣr ibn Ṣāliḥ ibn Mirdās) (died 22 May 1038), also known by his laqab (honorific epithet) of Shibl al-Dawla ('Lion cub of the Dynasty'), was the second Mirdasid emir of Aleppo, ruling between May 1029 until his death. He was the eldest son of Salih ibn Mirdas, founder of the Mirdasid dynasty. Nasr fought alongside his father in the Battle of al-Uqhuwana near Tiberias in 1029, where Salih was killed by a Fatimid army led by Anushtakin al-Dizbari. Afterward, Nasr ruled the emirate jointly with his brother Thimal. The young emirs soon after faced a large-scale Byzantine offensive led by Emperor Romanos III. Commanding a much smaller force of Bedouin horsemen, Nasr routed the Byzantines at the Battle of Azaz in 1030.

After his victory, Nasr ousted Thimal from Aleppo and entered into Byzantine vassalage, while maintaining ties with the Fatimids. He nominally recognized Fatimid suzerainty in 1037 and was concurrently given control of Hims, which the Mirdasids had lost to the Fatimids several years prior. Anushtakin, who had become governor of Syria, objected to Nasr's acquisition of Hims. In 1038, his forces marched against Nasr and killed him in a battle in the environs of Hama. Nasr was succeeded by Thimal, but Aleppo fell to Anushtakin weeks later. Mirdasid rule was restored in 1042 and continued with some interruptions until 1080.

Nasr renovated the Aleppo Citadel and made it his seat of power. Under the direction of his local Christian vizier, al-Mu'ammal al-Shammas, Aleppo was expanded and urbanized to accommodate an influx of Muslims from the countryside. Nasr's rule was limited to the northern Syrian part of the emirate, while the Mirdasids' Upper Mesopotamian fortresses were controlled by Thimal. His relations with his own tribe, the Banu Kilab, were often strained, but Nasr secured strong ties with the powerful Banu Numayr by marrying the Numayrid princess al-Sayyida Alawiyya. With her, he had a son, Mahmud, who ruled Aleppo in 1065–1075.

== Early life and career ==
Nasr was the eldest son of Salih ibn Mirdas, the preeminent emir of the Bedouin (nomadic) Banu Kilab tribe and founder of the Mirdasid dynasty. By 1025, Salih's Aleppo-based Mirdasid emirate covered much of northern Syria, the western Jazira (Upper Mesopotamia) and the central Syrian towns of Sidon, Baalbek and Homs. Salih ruled independently but nominally recognized Fatimid suzerainty over his emirate. In 1029, he supported his ally, Hassan ibn Mufarrij, the Jarrahid emir of the Bedouin Banu Tayy tribe, against a Fatimid army led by Anushtakin al-Dizbari. In May 1029, the two sides fought at the Battle of al-Uqhuwana near Lake Tiberias, which ended in a rout for the Tayy–Kilab coalition and the death of Salih. The Mirdasids subsequently lost Sidon, Baalbek, Homs, and Rafaniyya, and concentrated their forces in Jund Qinnasrin (the district of northern Syria) and Diyar Mudar (the district of the western Jazira).

Nasr fought alongside his father, but escaped al-Uqhuwana and returned to Aleppo, where his younger brother, Thimal, had been left to administer affairs in his father's absence. The two surviving coins minted during Salih's reign indicate that Thimal had been designated as Salih's wali al-ahd (chosen successor) in 1028 or 1029, in the months before Salih's death. In any event, after Salih's death, Nasr and Thimal ruled Aleppo jointly, with Nasr based in the city and Thimal in the citadel.

== Conflict with the Byzantines ==
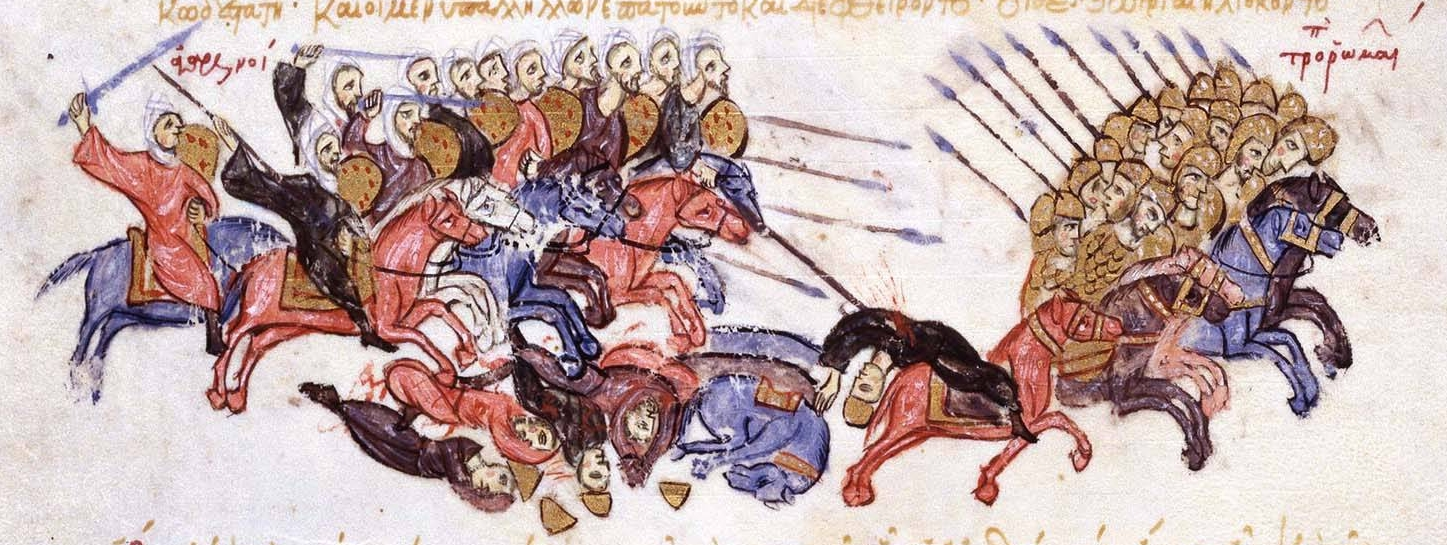
The Battle of Azaz, miniature from the Madrid Skylitzes

The youth and inexperience of Nasr and Thimal was viewed by the Byzantine katepano of Antioch, Michael Spondyles, as an opportunity to establish a protectorate over the Mirdasids' domains and prevent the re-establishment of Fatimid rule in the wake of Salih's death. Spondyles sent an expedition against Aleppo; however, Nasr and Thimal, leading their Kilabi tribesmen, ambushed and routed the Byzantine force at Qaybar (in Aleppo's western countryside) in July 1029. In the aftermath, Spondyles was dismissed by Emperor Romanos III (r. 1028–1034), who resolved to avenge the Byzantine loss, install his ally, the former emir of Aleppo Mansur ibn Lu'lu', in place of the Mirdasids, and in the process, achieve a glorious military victory over the Arabs.

Romanos III arrived at Antioch with a 20,000-strong army, composed mostly of mercenaries, on 20 July 1030, and sent a messenger to Nasr and Thimal demanding they cede Aleppo to him. Nasr rejected the demand, detained the envoy and sent his own diplomatic mission, led by his cousin Muqallid ibn Kamil, to persuade Romanos to desist from attacking Aleppo. Nasr's envoys told Romanos that the Mirdasids had not given the Byzantines any pretext for war and maintained the Byzantine protectorate and alliance per the treaty of 969. They also related that they were prepared for war should Romanos continue his offensive against Aleppo. Nasr's envoys were detained and Romanos continued his march, setting up camp outside Azaz, to the northwest of Aleppo. Nasr and Thimal, meanwhile, evacuated their families from the city, and mobilized the Kilab, the Banu Numayr and other Bedouin tribes, as well as local Muslims from Aleppo and its hinterland. The bulk of the Mirdasid force remained with Thimal to defend Aleppo and its citadel, while Nasr and some 700–900 Bedouin horsemen left to confront the Byzantines.

Romanos, whose army was encamped in a barren plain during the summer heat, sent a force to survey the fortress of Azaz, but these troops were all killed or captured by the Mirdasids. Romanos subsequently decided to withdraw toward Byzantine territory. Disorder soon spread throughout the Byzantine camp, with Armenian mercenaries looting the camp's market and trench guards fleeing for safety. Nasr and his Kilabi warriors used this opportunity to launch a surprise sortie against the retreating Byzantine troops. The latter were decisively defeated and chaotically dispersed. According to the contemporary Byzantine historian Michael Psellus, Romanos "himself was almost captured and made prisoner by the enemy [Mirdasids]", who, "as if amazed at the sight of the Romans [Byzantines] routed and fleeing for no reason, merely stood and watched this outstanding triumph".

== Emir of Aleppo ==
=== Seizure of power ===
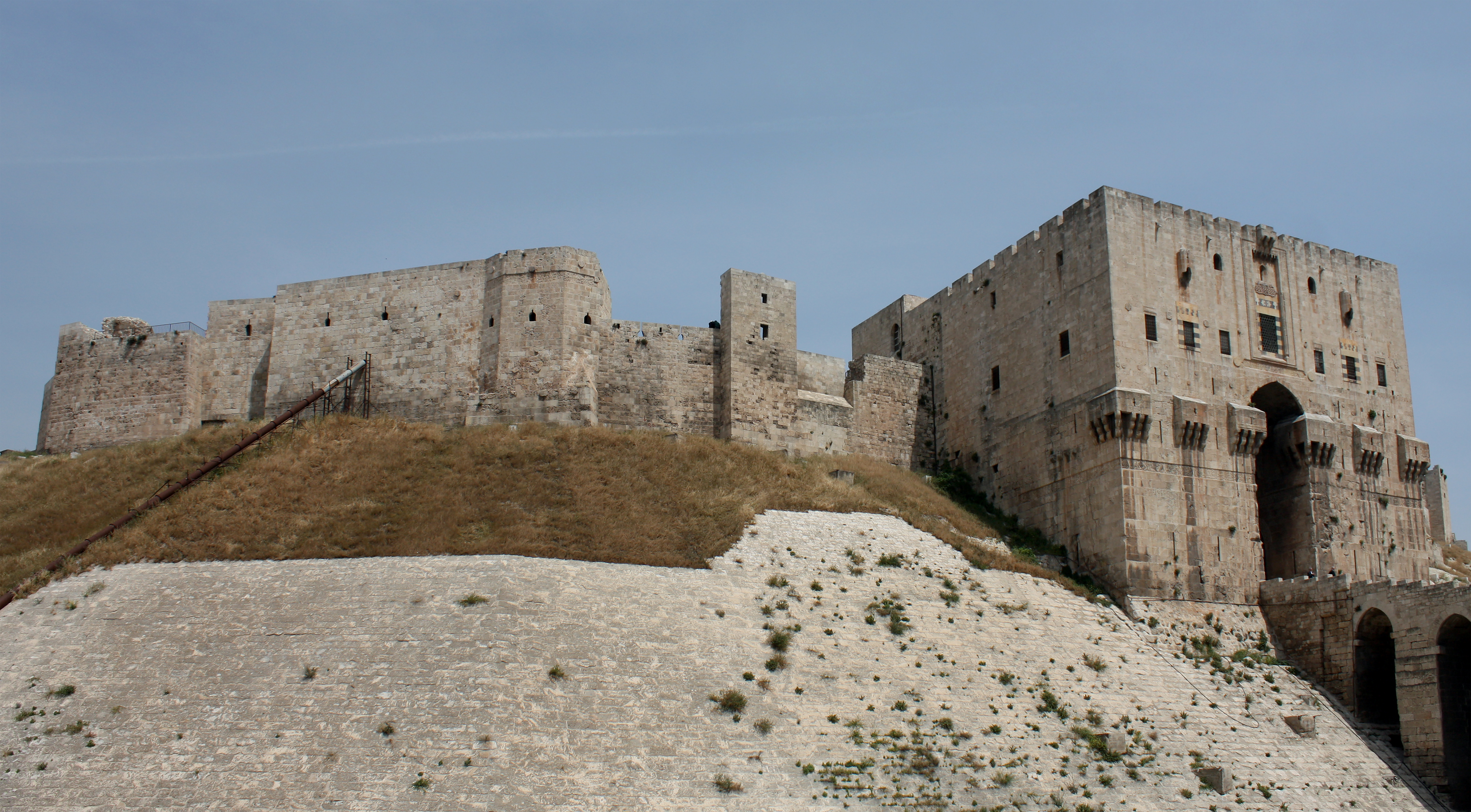
Nasr seized the Aleppo Citadel from his brother Thimal in 1030, and became sole ruler of Aleppo and made it his seat of power. The present citadel (pictured) dates to the 13th century

Nasr opposed Thimal's appointment as their father's successor and sought to take sole control of Aleppo. There are two accounts about Nasr's seizure of power, both agreeing that Nasr took the Aleppo citadel while Thimal was away. In the account of the 13th-century Aleppine historian Ibn al-Adim, Nasr and his men seized the citadel when Thimal was in the Kilabi tribal camps in Aleppo's outskirts attempting to persuade his estranged wife to return to the city. In reaction, Thimal mobilized his Kilabi loyalists with the goal of retaking Aleppo, but the arrival of Romanos's forces spurred the Kilabi chieftains to mediate the dispute between Nasr and Thimal. In the ensuing agreement, Nasr was to control the Syrian part of the emirate from Aleppo, while Thimal would rule the Mesopotamian part from al-Rahba, a fortress on the Euphrates River at the crossroads of Syria and Iraq.

The account by the 11th-century local historian Yahya of Antioch, and also cited by Ibn al-Adim, holds that Nasr's coup took place after the Battle of Azaz. Accordingly, when Thimal left Aleppo to bring back his family to the city after Nasr's victory over the Byzantines, Nasr took control of the citadel in his absence. The modern historian Suhayl Zakkar asserts that Yahya's account was the more likely scenario, particularly because Nasr immediately appealed for Byzantine forgiveness and protection, offering an annual tribute of 500,000 dirhams, despite his decisive victory over Romanos at Azaz; Zakkar holds Nasr's spontaneous offer to the Byzantines was prompted by Kilabi dissent or threats organized by Thimal in response to the latter's ouster.

=== Byzantine vassalage and Fatimid relations ===
Romanos accepted Nasr's offer and declared the emirate of Aleppo a vassal of the empire, obliging the Byzantines to back and protect Nasr in case of aggression. Nasr's vassalage with the Byzantines became the principal sticking point in Byzantine–Fatimid peace negotiations, which commenced in 1031. While Romanos adamantly sought to include Nasr's emirate in the proposed treaty, he died and was replaced in 1034 by Emperor Michael IV (r. 1034–1041); the latter was more conciliatory toward Fatimid concerns. When negotiations concluded in 1036 with a ten-year truce (hudna), the issue of Aleppo was excluded. According to Zakkar, "Byzantium, which by this Treaty, had solved most of its problems with the Fatimid Caliphate, lost interest in Aleppo, or at least no longer deemed it to be of the same political importance."

Map showing Nasr's emirate of Aleppo (bottom right corner) as a vassal of the Byzantine Empire

The Byzantine–Fatimid treaty weakened Nasr's strategic position and forced him to improve relations with the Fatimids. As early as 1030, Nasr had sought Fatimid approval of his rule and dispatched an envoy carrying a large amount of war booty from Azaz to the Fatimid caliph al-Zahir (r. 1021–1036). In turn, the caliph accepted Nasr's authority in Aleppo, at least for the time being. However, there is no indication that Nasr paid the Fatimids tribute. Nasr's envoy remained in Cairo for several years and likely did not return to Aleppo until after the accession of Caliph al-Mustansir (r. 1036–1094). Zakkar speculates this indicated discord between Aleppo and Cairo due to Nasr's continued tribute to Byzantium instead of to the Fatimids or Fatimid reservations at Nasr's request for the governorship of Jund Hims (the district of Homs).

Following the 1036 treaty, Michael IV mediated between Nasr and al-Mustansir by advising the former to accept the Fatimids' conditions, which are not known; the contemporary chroniclers provided scant information about Nasr's relations with the Fatimids between 1030 and 1036. Nasr's envoy returned to Aleppo in 1037 with a diploma giving Nasr the governorship of Hims, as well as gifts and robes of honor from al-Mustansir, whose suzerainty was nominally acknowledged by Nasr. Al-Mustansir also bestowed on Nasr the noble titles of mukhtas al-umara ('the distinguished of the emirs'), khastu'l-imam ('the special one of the Imam'), shams al-dawla wa majdiha ('the sun and glory of the Dynasty') and dhu'l-azimatayn ('the holder of the two glories'), in addition to his previous title of shibl al-dawla ('lion cub of the Dynasty').

=== Fortifications ===
Nasr moved the seat of the emirate to the Aleppo Citadel, marking a change from previous tradition whereby Aleppo's rulers were based in a palace in the city or its outskirts. According to Zakkar, this "brought about the erection of magnificent apartments and reception halls" in the citadel, which thenceforth became the residence of Nasr and later rulers of the city.

To make up for the loss of Hisn Ibn Akkar to the Fatimid governor of Tripoli in 1033, Nasr strengthened Hisn al-Safh (the future Krak des Chevaliers) on the northern end of the Homs Gap, opposite Hisn Ibn Akkar. He garrisoned the fortress with Kurdish tribal auxiliaries, hence its more common Arabic name Hisn al-Akrad ('Fortress of the Kurds').

=== Domestic affairs ===
Upon seizing power, Nasr, like his father, appointed an Aleppine Christian, al-Mu'ammal al-Shammas, as vizier to administer civilian and military affairs. During Mirdasid rule, a large influx of peasants and nomads from the countryside moved to Aleppo, resulting in the establishment of crowded quarters and suburbs within and outside the city's walls. Al-Mu'ammal, aided by his brother, oversaw the urbanization of these suburbs and the construction of mosques and hammams (bathhouses) to accommodate the new arrivals.

Nasr sealed ties with the Numayrids, a Bedouin dynasty which ruled a string of cities in the western Jazira, by marrying al-Sayyida Alawiyya, sister of Shabib ibn Waththab, the Numayrid emir of Harran. The Numayrids were distant tribal kin and traditional allies of the Banu Kilab and the Mirdasids.

In 1031, Nasr took part in a Byzantine campaign against a Druze uprising in Jabal al-Summaq (also called Jabal al-A'la), southwest of Aleppo, which "threatened both their interests", according to the historian Hugh N. Kennedy. Nasr's vassalage to the Byzantines provoked the opposition of Salim ibn al-Mustafad, Aleppo's ra'is al-balad (municipal chief) and leader of the ahdath (urban paramilitaries), who had been appointed by Salih. Ibn al-Mustafad stirred a rebellion among the ahdath and the lower and middle-class residents of the Zajjajin quarter in protest at the alliance. This prompted the Byzantine governor of Antioch to request Nasr kill Ibn al-Mustafad. Accordingly, Nasr had Ibn al-Mustafad arrested and executed in 1034.

=== Downfall and death ===
Nasr's acquisition of Hims in 1037 came at the expense of its Fatimid-appointed, Berber governor, Ja'far ibn Kulayd al-Kutami, who was concurrently dismissed from the governorship. Ibn Kulayd appealed for the assistance of Anushtakin, who at the time was the Damascus-based Fatimid governor of Syria. The latter was already perturbed by the expansion of the Mirdasid realm to Hims, which would give the Byzantine-backed Mirdasid–Numayrid alliance full control of the lowland regions and routes between the Iraqi frontier and the Mediterranean Sea. Anushtakin relayed his concerns to the Fatimid court, which was effectively run by the vizier Ali al-Jarjara'i, the power behind the throne. It was al-Jarjara'i who had granted Nasr the governorship of Hims partly to check Anushtakin's power and territorial ambitions in Syria. Anushtakin did not await Cairo's response, and he and Ibn Kulayd mobilized their forces to assert direct Fatimid rule over northern Syria. Anushtakin's army was bolstered by troops from the Banu Kalb and Banu Tayy, as well as a faction of the Banu Kilab opposed to the Mirdasids. Moreover, Anushtakin gained Byzantine permission to take Aleppo provided he maintain the emirate's annual tribute.

Upon hearing of Anushtakin's campaign against him, Nasr mobilized his local and Kilabi forces, including Thimal and his loyalists, and set out to confront the Fatimid coalition. Nasr's force was defeated in a battle just west of Salamiyah, and withdrew toward Hama to regroup. Meanwhile, Anushtakin's troops attacked and plundered Hama and moved against Nasr's camp. On 22 May 1038, the two sides fought at Tell Fas, a site immediately west of Latmin in Hama's northwestern countryside. During the ensuing battle, Thimal and his men abandoned Nasr and his core loyalists, who were left to face the much larger Fatimid coalition. Thimal's reason for fleeing is not known, though he likely used it as an opportunity to wrest back control of Aleppo. Nasr, meanwhile, was "killed fighting bravely", according to Kennedy. His head was given to Anushtakin and his body was displayed on the gate of the Hama Citadel.

=== Succession ===
Thimal succeeded Nasr as emir of Aleppo but, fearing Anushtakin's northward advance, left the city shortly after in the company of Nasr's children, Shabib ibn Waththab, and Nasr's widow al-Sayyida Alawiyya, who Thimal later married. Thimal entrusted governance of the city and the citadel to his kinsmen, Khalifa ibn Jabir al-Kilabi and Muqallid ibn Kamil, respectively. These governors surrendered the city to Anushtakin's forces in June 1038, following a siege. With this, Anushtakin brought all of Syria under direct Fatimid administration for the first time. In 1042, Anushtakin died and Thimal restored Mirdasid rule over the city with al-Jarjara'i's backing.

== Bibliography ==
- Amabe, Fukuzo (2016). Urban Autonomy in Medieval Islam: Damascus, Aleppo, Cordoba, Toledo, Valencia and Tunis. Leiden: Brill. ISBN 978-90-0431598-3.
- Bianquis, Thierry (1993). "Mirdās, Banū or Mirdāsids". In Bosworth, C. E.; van Donzel, E.; Heinrichs, W. P. & Pellat, Ch. (eds.). The Encyclopaedia of Islam, Second Edition. Volume VII: Mif–Naz. Leiden: E. J. Brill. pp. 115–123. ISBN 978-90-04-09419-2.
- Crawford, Robert W. (April–June 1953). "Reconstruction of a Struggle within the Mirdāsid Dynasty in Ḥalab". Journal of the American Oriental Society. 73 (2): 89–95. doi:10.2307/595365. JSTOR 595365.
- Kennedy, Hugh (2004) [1986]. The Prophet and the Age of the Caliphates: The Islamic Near East from the 6th to the 11th Century (Second ed.). Harlow: Longman. ISBN 978-0-582-40525-7.
- Salibi, Kamal S. (1977). Syria Under Islam: Empire on Trial, 634–1097, Volume 1. Delmar: Caravan Books. ISBN 978-0-88206013-2.
- Shepard, J. (2010). "Azaz, Battle near". In Rogers, C. (ed.). The Oxford Encyclopedia of Medieval Warfare and Military Technology, Volume 1. Oxford: Oxford University Press. p. 102. ISBN 978-0-19-533403-6.
- Wortley, John, ed. (2010). John Skylitzes: A Synopsis of Byzantine History, 811–1057. Cambridge: Cambridge University Press. ISBN 978-0-521-76705-7.
- Zakkar, Suhayl (1971). The Emirate of Aleppo: 1004–1094. Beirut: Dar al-Amanah. OCLC 977126570.

Preceded by Salih ibn Mirdas	Emir of Aleppo; May 1029–May 1038; With: Mu'izz al-Dawla Thimal (1029–1030)	Succeeded by Mu'izz al-Dawla Thimal
