= Thu'ban ibn Muhammad =

Fatimid governor of Aleppo from 1024 to 1025

Sadid al-Mulk Thu'ban ibn Muhammad ibn Thu'ban

Fatimid Governor of Aleppo
- In office 27 July 1024 – 30 June 1025
- Appointed by: Az-Zahir
- Lieutenant: Mawsuf (governor of the citadel)
- Preceded by: Al-Hasan ibn Muhammad ibn Thu'ban
- Succeeded by: Salih ibn Mirdas

Sadīd al-Mulk Thuʿbān ibn Muḥammad ibn Thuʿbān (Arabic: ثعبان بن محمد) was the Fatimid governor of Aleppo between 27 July 1024 and 30 June 1025. Thu'ban was a Kutami Berber commander based in Cairo until he was assigned by Caliph az-Zahir (r. 1021–1036) to replace Thu'ban's brother, Sanad al-Dawla al-Hasan, as governor of Aleppo after al-Hasan died of illness. Thu'ban was given the title sadid al-mulk (the right to kingship). His rule over Aleppo was described as "unpopular" by historian Suhayl Zakkar.

In 1024 Salih ibn Mirdas, leader of the Banu Kilab, began attempts to wrest control of Aleppo. His forces sporadically clashed with Thu'ban's troops beginning in October 1024, and in 22 November, Salih himself besieged the city. After weeks of heavy clashes, Thu'ban was betrayed by Salim ibn Mustafad, the head of Aleppo's ahdath (urban militia), who opened Aleppo's Bab Qinnasrin gate to Salih. The latter entered Aleppo on 18 January 1025, prompting Thu'ban to barricade himself in the former palace of Aziz al-Dawla at the foot Aleppo's citadel. By 30 June, Salih's forces captured the palace and the citadel, and arrested Thu'ban. When Salih returned to Aleppo in September, he freed Thu'ban in return for a payment, but executed Mawsuf, the Fatimid commander of the citadel.

== Bibliography ==
- Amabe, Fukuzo (2016). Urban Autonomy in Medieval Islam: Damascus, Aleppo, Cordoba, Toledo, Valencia and Tunis. Leiden: Brill.
- Zakkar, Suhayl (1971). The Emirate of Aleppo: 1004–1094. Aleppo: Dar al-Amanah.

Preceded by Al-Hasan ibn Muhammad	Emir of Aleppo; July 1024–June 1025	Succeeded by Salih ibn Mirdas
