= Salih ibn Mirdas =

Emir of Aleppo

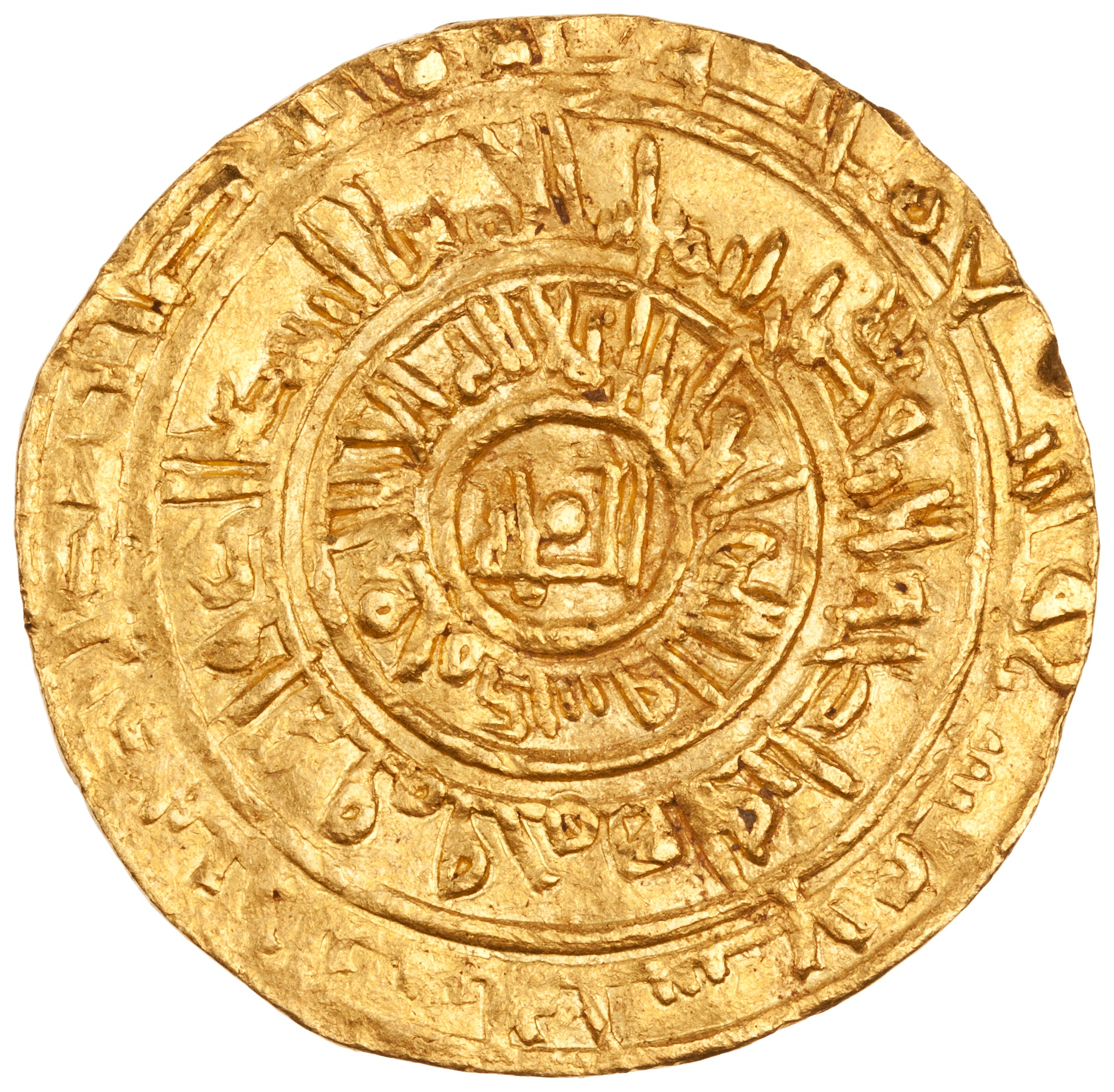
- Gold dinar minted in Aleppo in the name of Salih ibn Mirdas and recognizing the suzerainty of Fatimid caliph az-Zahir, 1028/29 CE

Emir of Aleppo
- Reign: June 1025–May 1029
- Predecessor: Thu'ban ibn Muhammad
- Successor: Mu'izz al-Dawla Thimal; Shibl al-Dawla Nasr
- Died: May 1029; Al-Uqhuwana, eastern shore of Lake Tiberias
- Spouse: Tarud
- Issue: Shibl al-Dawla Nasr; Mu'izz al-Dawla Thimal; Asad al-Dawla Atiyya
Names
- Abū ʿAlī Ṣāliḥ ibn Mirdās
Regnal name
- Asad al-Dawla (Lion of the State)
- Tribe: Banu Kilab
- Dynasty: Mirdasid
- Father: Mirdas ibn Idris
- Mother: Rabab al-Zawqaliyya
- Religion: Shia Islam

Abu Ali Salih ibn Mirdas (Note: Arabic: ابو علي صالح بن مرداس, romanized: Abū ʿAlī Ṣāliḥ ibn Mirdās) (Note: Salih's full name and genealogy as cited by the Syria-based historians Ibn al-Adim (died 1262) and Ibn Khallikan (died 1282) was Abū ʿAlī Ṣāliḥ ibn Mirdās ibn Idrīs ibn Nāṣir ibn Ḥumayd ibn Mudrik ibn Shaddād ibn ʿUbayd ibn Qays ibn Rabīʿa ibn Kaʿb ibn ʿAbd Allāh ibn Abū Bakr ibn Kilāb ibn Rabīʿa ibn ʿĀmir ibn Ṣaʿṣaʿ ibn Muʿāwiya ibn Bakr ibn Hawāzin ibn Manṣūr ibn ʿIkrima ibn Khaṣafa ibn Qays ʿAylān.) also known by his laqab (honorific epithet) Asad al-Dawla (lit. 'Lion of the State'), was the founder of the Mirdasid dynasty and emir of Aleppo from 1025 until his death in May 1029. At its peak, his emirate (principality) encompassed much of the western Jazira (Upper Mesopotamia), northern Syria and several central Syrian towns. With occasional interruption, Salih's descendants ruled Aleppo for the next five decades.

Salih launched his career in 1008, when he seized the Euphrates river fortress of al-Rahba. In 1012, he was imprisoned and tortured by the emir of Aleppo, Mansur ibn Lu'lu'. Two years later he escaped, capturing Mansur in battle and releasing him for numerous concessions, including half of Aleppo's revenues. This cemented Salih as the paramount emir of his tribe, the Banu Kilab, many of whose chieftains had died in Mansur's dungeons. With his Bedouin warriors, Salih captured a string of fortresses along the Euphrates, including Manbij and Raqqa, by 1022. He later formed an alliance with the Banu Kalb and Banu Tayy tribes and supported their struggle against the Fatimids of Egypt. During this tribal rebellion, Salih annexed the central Syrian towns of Homs, Baalbek and Sidon, before conquering Fatimid-held Aleppo in 1025, bringing "to success the plan which guided his [Banu Kilab] forebears for a century", according to historian Thierry Bianquis.

Salih established a well-organized administration over his Aleppo-based domains. Militarily, he relied on the Banu Kilab, while entrusting fiscal administration to his local Christian vizier, policing to the aḥdāth (urban militia) under Salim ibn Mustafad, and judicial matters to a Shia Muslim qāḍī (head judge). His rule was officially tolerated by the Fatimids, to whom he paid formal allegiance. His alliance with the Banu Tayy ultimately drew him into conflict with the Fatimid general, Anushtakin al-Dizbari, whose forces killed Salih in the Battle of al-Uqhuwana near Lake Tiberias. Salih was succeeded by his sons Nasr and Thimal.

== Early life and career ==
=== Family and tribe ===
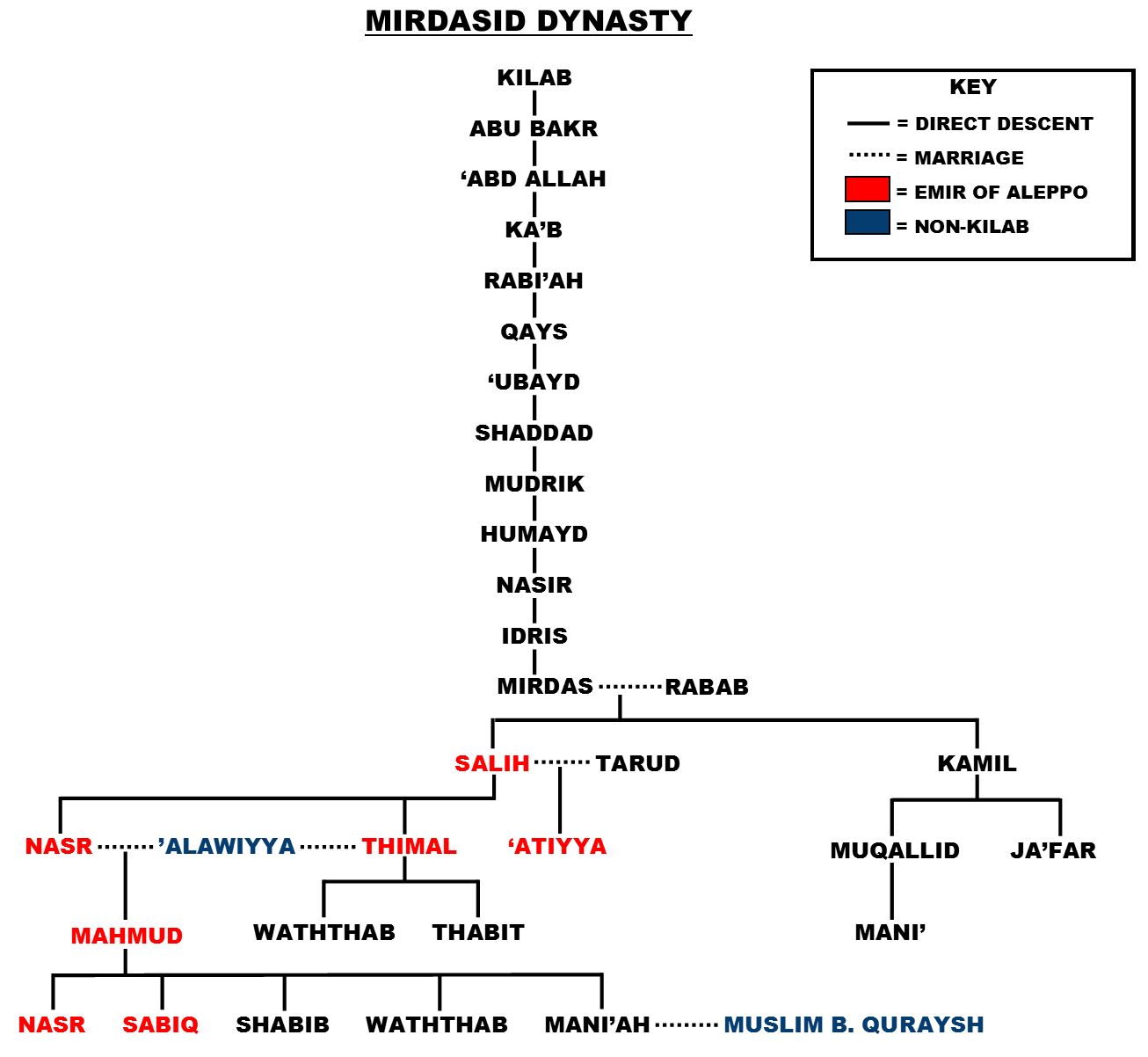
Genealogy of Salih ibn Mirdas and the Mirdasid dynasty

The year of Salih ibn Mirdas' birth is not known. Both of Salih's parents belonged to noble households of the Bedouin (nomadic Arab) tribe of Banu Kilab. His father was Mirdas ibn Idris, from a princely clan of the Kilab, specifically from the Rabi'a ibn Ka'b line of the Abd Allah ibn Abu Bakr branch. Nothing else is known about Mirdas ibn Idris. Salih's mother, Rabab al-Zawqaliyya, belonged to the princely Kilabi clan of Zawqal, which inhabited the environs of Aleppo. Salih had at least three brothers, only one of whom, Kamil, is named in sources, and at least four sons, Nasr (d. 1038), Thimal (d. 1062), Atiyya (d. 1071/72) and the youngest whose name is not known (d. 1029). Salih's family inhabited and controlled the town of Qinnasrin (ancient Chalcis), to the southwest of Aleppo. Like most Aleppine Muslims in the 10th–11th centuries, the Kilab embraced Twelver Shia Islam. Although it is not clear how strongly the tribesmen identified with their faith, Salih's kunya (paedonymic), "Abū ʿAlī" (father of Ali), honored Ali ibn Abi Talib, a central figure in Shia tradition.

The Kilab were a major sub-tribe of the Banu Amir and first migrated to Syria from central Arabia during the 7th-century Muslim conquest. They soon became a pillar of the Qaysi tribal faction and established their strongholds in the Jazira (Upper Mesopotamia) and the steppes around Aleppo, which thenceforth became their diyār (tribal territory). Through their military strength and consistent ambition to govern and keep order in the territories they inhabited, the Kilab persisted as a powerful force in northern Syria throughout the following centuries. In 932–933, another wave of Kilabi tribesmen moved to the environs of Aleppo as soldiers of an invading Qarmatian army; according to the historian Suhayl Zakkar, the new arrivals "paved the way to the rise and establishment of the Mirdasid dynasty". By then, the Kilab had established itself as the dominant tribal force in northern Syria and played a significant role in all of the uprisings and internecine fighting involving the Hamdanid rulers of Aleppo, between 945 and 1002.

=== Emir of al-Rahba ===
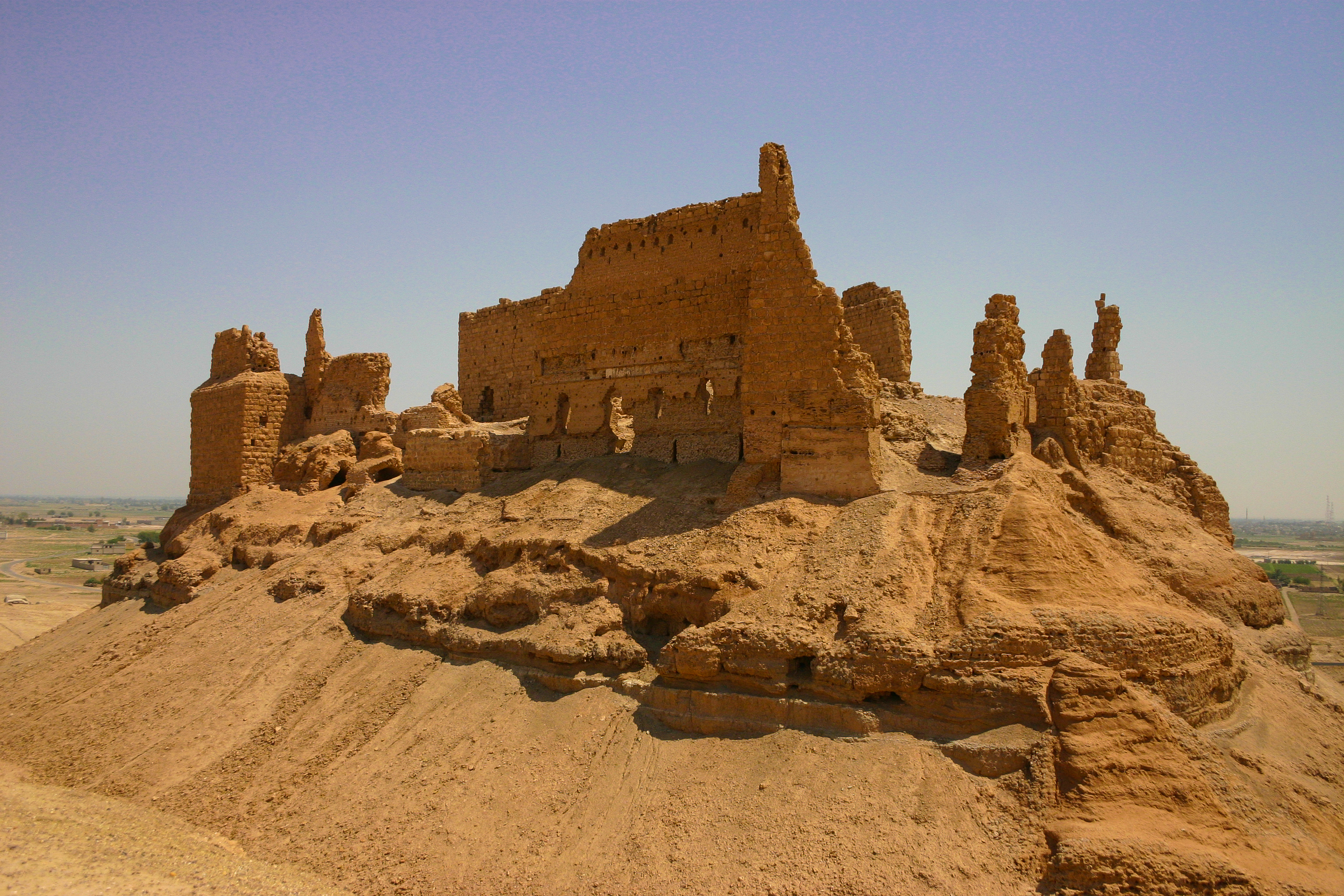
Salih was first mentioned in the historical record when he captured the fortress of al-Rahba (pictured in 2005) in 1008. The fortress as depicted in the photograph dates to the 12th century.

Salih is first mentioned in 1008 in relation to the power struggle over the Euphrates fortress town of al-Rahba. The town was strategically situated at the crossroads between Syria and Iraq and frequently contested by local and regional powers. In 1008, Ibn Mihkan, a native of al-Rahba, expelled its Fatimid governor and sought Salih's military backing to uphold his rule. Salih continued to dwell in his tribe's desert encampment, and it is not known what he received in exchange for protecting Ibn Mihkan. A dispute soon arose between Salih and Ibn Mihkan, leading the former to besiege al-Rahba.

The hostilities came to an end following an agreement that stipulated Salih's marriage to Ibn Mihkan's daughter and Ibn Mihkan's relocation to Anah, which he would rule in addition to al-Rahba. When Anah's inhabitants revolted against Ibn Mihkan, Salih intervened to reassert his father-in-law's rule. Amid these developments, Ibn Mihkan was assassinated; contemporary chroniclers assume that Salih ordered his death. Salih proceeded to capture al-Rahba and proclaim his allegiance to the Fatimid caliph, al-Hakim. This marked "the first step in Salih's career and from which his ambition probably evolved", according to Zakkar. His capture of al-Rahba most likely boosted his prestige among the Kilab.

=== Supreme emir of the Banu Kilab ===
Between 1009 and 1012, the Kilab participated in the struggle for control of Aleppo between the emirate's ruler Mansur ibn Lu'lu' and its former rulers, the Hamdanids, and their regional backers. Twice the Kilab betrayed the Hamdanids and their allies, and in return, demanded from Mansur numerous pastures to breed their flocks and war horses. Instead, Mansur, who viewed the Kilab as a hindrance to his rule, strove to eliminate them by luring the tribesmen into a trap. To that end, on 27 May 1012, he invited them to a feast. Once the tribesmen entered his palace, the gates were locked and Mansur and his ghilmān (slave soldiers or pages; sing. ghulām) attacked them. Several were killed and the rest, including Salih, were imprisoned in the citadel of Aleppo. Afterward, the Kilabi emir Muqallid ibn Za'ida besieged the town of Kafartab to gain leverage with Mansur. This prompted the latter to move the Kilabi prisoners to facilities with better conditions in case of future peace negotiations with Muqallid. Upon hearing of Muqallid's death and his failed siege, Mansur returned the prisoners to the citadel's dungeons, where many among them, including some chieftains, were executed or died from torture or poor conditions. Salih was among those tortured, and was also forced to divorce his wife and cousin Tarud, who was famed for her beauty, so that Mansur could wed her. Zakkar writes that it is not known whether this was meant to humiliate Salih, "an energetic and bold" emir, or to establish marital ties with other elements of the Kilab. Mansur frequently threatened to execute Salih, who upon being informed of these threats, escaped the citadel. According to the reports of medieval chroniclers, Salih managed to cut one of his shackles and make a hole in his cell wall. Then, on the night of 3 July 1014, he jumped from the wall of the citadel with one shackle still attached to his leg, and hid in a drain pipe for the remainder of the night until joining his tribesmen at their encampment in Marj Dabiq. Zakkar questions the truth of this story, and asserts that it is likelier that Salih escaped through bribery or a friendly arrangement with a guard.

Salih's escape boosted Kilabi morale, and they assembled to offer him their allegiance. In the following days, the Kilab under Salih besieged Aleppo, but Mansur's forces were able to plunder their camp and capture fifty tribesmen. Buoyed by his victory, Mansur collected his army of ghilmān in Aleppo, along with local ruffians, Christians and Jews, and confronted Salih's forces on the outskirts of Aleppo. The Kilab routed their opponents, killing some 2,000 Aleppines in the process, and captured Mansur. Negotiations between Salih and Mansur's representatives ensued, concluding with an agreement that freed Mansur in return for the release of Salih's brothers, a ransom of 50,000 gold dinars, and the allotment of half of the Emirate of Aleppo's revenues to the Kilab. Salih was able to remarry Tarud and was also given Mansur's daughter to wed. Furthermore, Mansur recognized Salih as the supreme emir of the Kilab, formally investing him with authority and control over his tribesmen.

== Establishment of Mirdasid emirate ==
=== Mesopotamian conquests and struggle for Aleppo ===
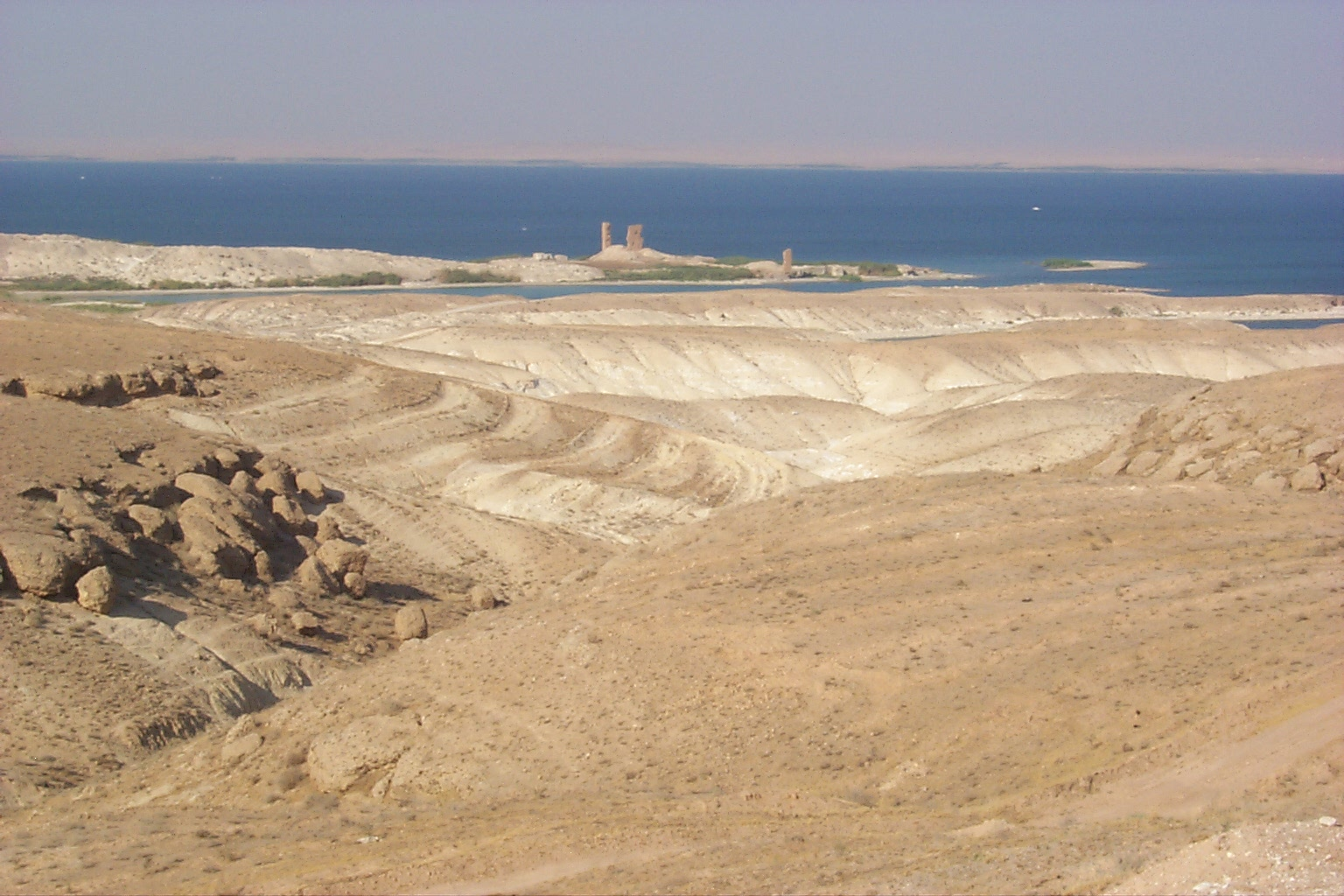
Ruins of Balis (pictured in 2005) on the Euphrates River. Between 1009 and 1022, Salih laid the foundations of his emirate by capturing a string of fortress towns along the Euphrates, including Balis, Manbij, al-Rahba, Raqqa and al-Rafiqah

Using his new-found power, Salih captured the Euphrates towns of Manbij and Balis, located east and southeast of Aleppo, respectively. With these conquests and his control of al-Rahba, Salih established what would become the Jaziran portion of the Mirdasid emirate. This crossroads region was agriculturally, commercially and strategically valuable, and put Salih in contact with the Byzantines, the Fatimids and the rulers of Iraq. Meanwhile, the agreement between Salih and Mansur collapsed as the latter abandoned most of his promises, including giving his daughter's hand in marriage and according the Kilab their share of Aleppo's revenues. Salih retaliated by besieging Aleppo, while the Kilab and their Bedouin allies plundered the countryside. Mansur appealed for Byzantine intervention and warned the Byzantine emperor, Basil II (r. 976–1025), that if left unchecked, the Bedouin uprising could spread to his territory. Basil dispatched 1,000 Armenian relief troops in response, but withdrew them after Salih informed him of Mansur's treachery and pledged his goodwill to the Byzantines. Basil may have also acquiesced to Salih's activities to avoid provoking Bedouin raids against his territory, which bordered the emirates of both the Kilab and their Numayri kinsmen. (Note: The Banu Kilab and the Banu Numayr were major branches of the Banu Amir tribe.) The withdrawal of Byzantine troops weakened Mansur's position further and strengthened Salih, who dispatched one of his sons to Constantinople to pay allegiance to Basil.

In January 1016, Mansur fled Aleppo after the citadel commander, Fath al-Qal'i, revolted and recognized Salih's emirate and Caliph al-Hakim's suzerainty over Aleppo. According to Aleppine chroniclers, the revolt was coordinated with Salih, who was restored his share of Aleppo's revenues and given custody of the mother, wives and daughters of Mansur; Salih immediately sent the women to join their patriarch, but kept one of the latter's daughters to marry, per their earlier arrangement. Mansur's ouster and the subsequent disorder in northern Syria drove Basil to halt all travel and trade with Syria and Egypt, but Salih persuaded him to exempt Aleppo and the Kilab from these sanctions. To secure his hold over Aleppo, Fath invited Fatimid troops from Afamiyah led by Ali al-Dayf. Al-Hakim bestowed on Salih the laqab of Asad al-Dawla ('Lion of the State') and requested that he cooperate with al-Dayf. Salih opposed the Fatimid presence in Aleppo and proposed an arrangement to Fath giving the latter control of the citadel and the Kilab control of the city. Fath responded favorably, but Aleppo's inhabitants protested the rumored deal, demanding the establishment of Fatimid rule; they enjoyed al-Hakim's tax exemptions and opposed Bedouin governance. Fath was compelled to relocate to Tyre by al-Hakim, who also sent reinforcements to Aleppo. Salih was thus prevented from seizing the city. Nonetheless, Mansur's flight and the instability of Fatimid rule enabled him to strengthen his Jaziran emirate. He established his own administration and tribal court, which as early as 1019, was visited by the Arab poet Ibn Abi Hasina, who became a prominent panegyrist of the Mirdasid dynasty.

Meanwhile, in 1017, al-Hakim appointed Aziz al-Dawla, an Armenian ghulām, governor of Aleppo. Aziz established friendly relations with Salih and had the latter's mother live in Aleppo to strengthen ties. There is no mention of Salih's activities during Aziz's five-year reign; according to Zakkar, this indicated that Salih "was satisfied and remained contented" throughout this period. Though Salih was not strong enough to challenge the Fatimids, the Kilab were nonetheless given control of the plains surrounding Aleppo by Aziz. By 1022, Salih had extended his rule to the Euphrates twin towns of Raqqa and al-Rafiqah. In July of that year, Aziz was assassinated, allegedly by his Turkish ghulām, Abu'l-Najm Badr, who briefly succeeded him. This was followed by a succession of governors with short terms, the last being Thu'ban ibn Muhammad and Mawsuf al-Saqlabi as governors of the city and citadel, respectively.

=== Formation of the Bedouin alliance ===
Aziz's replacements were challenged by Salih and chaos prevailed in Aleppo. In 1023, Salih entered the Kilab into a military pact with the Banu Tayy of Transjordan and the Banu Kalb of central Syria, both of which opposed direct Fatimid rule. The contemporary historian Yahya al-Antaki relates that the alliance was a renewal of a previous pact made by the same parties in c. 1021, since which they rebelled against and ultimately reconciled with the new Fatimid caliph, az-Zahir (r. 1021–1036), who took power in the aftermath of al-Hakim's disappearance in 1021. The reconciliation unraveled by 1023 owing to the Tayy's conflict with the Fatimid governor of Palestine, Anushtakin al-Dizbari, which prompted the respective chieftains of Tayy and Kalb, Hassan ibn Mufarrij and Sinan ibn Ulayyan, to meet with Salih at the outskirts of Aleppo and renew the alliance. According to the terms of the pact, Syria would be split into three Bedouin-run states, the Kilab under Salih governing Aleppo and northern Syria, the Tayy under its princely Jarrahid household ruling Palestine from al-Ramla, and the Kalb ruling central Syria from Damascus. The combined strength of the three largest tribes in Syria made them a formidable opponent of the Fatimids. A Bedouin alliance of this magnitude and nature had not occurred since the 7th century and was made without consideration to the traditional Qaysi–Yamani rivalry between the tribes; the Tayy and Kalb were Yamani, while the Kilab were Qaysi. Moreover, its formation surprised Syria's population at the time, who were unaccustomed to the spectacle of Bedouin chiefs seeking kingship in the cities rather than nomadic life in the desert fringe. According to Zakkar, "Salih was the outstanding figure among the allies, particularly from a military standpoint", though Hassan apparently managed the allies' communications with the Fatimids.

In 1023, Salih and his Kilabi forces headed south and helped the Tayy evict Anushtakin's Fatimid troops from the interior regions of Palestine. Afterward, Salih assisted the Kalbi siege of Damascus. The Tayy and Kalb's revolts in Palestine and Jund Dimashq (Damascus Province), respectively, "supplied the impetus", according to Zakkar, for Salih to move on Aleppo, particularly as the Fatimids' grip on that city had been weakened. While he fought alongside his allies in the south, his kātib (secretary), Sulayman ibn Tawq, captured Ma'arrat Misrin in Aleppo's southern countryside from its Fatimid governor. In November, Salih returned to Aleppo in the belief that its defenders would immediately surrender to him, but this did not occur. He then withdrew and mobilized his tribal warriors and other local Bedouin.

=== Conquest of Aleppo ===
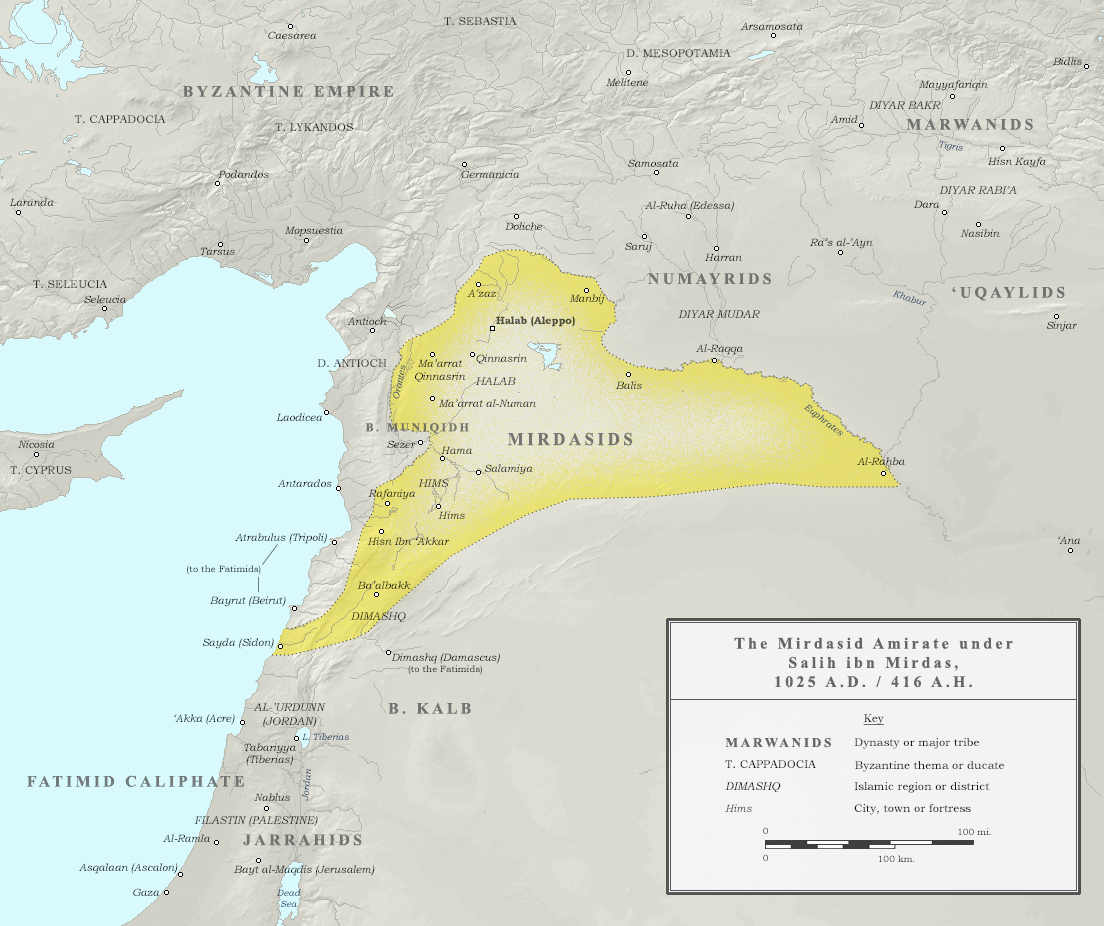
Map of the Mirdasid domains, highlighted in yellow, at their greatest extent during Salih's rule in 1025

In October 1024, Salih's forces, led by Ibn Tawq, advanced against Aleppo and fought in sporadic engagements with the Fatimid troops of governors Thu'ban and Mawsuf. Salih arrived at Aleppo—after having sacked several Syrian coastal districts—with large numbers of Bedouin warriors on 22 November. He besieged the city, first camping outside of Bab al-Jinan, where his demand for the surrender of Ibn Abi Usama, the city's qāḍī (head Islamic judge), and other notables was refused. He then gathered more troops and engaged Aleppo's defenders for over fifty days, resulting in heavy casualties on both sides. On 18 January 1025, the Bab Qinnasrin gate was opened to Salih by Salim ibn al-Mustafad, head of the city's surviving Hamdanid ghilmān; Ibn Mustafad had defected from the Fatimids after a quarrel with Mawsuf, and together with numerous townsmen and other former ghilmān, he welcomed Salih, who granted the inhabitants aman (safe conduct). Afterward, Salih had the towers of the city walls demolished. According to the contemporary Egyptian chronicler al-Musabbihi, this led the local populace to believe Salih was preparing to hand over Aleppo to the Byzantines; fearing this, they fought alongside Fatimid troops and briefly ousted Salih's forces, killing some 250 Kilabi warriors. Zakkar views Salih's destruction of Aleppo's towers as a tactic that would enable an easier reconquest of the city should his troops be ousted.

On 23 January, Salih besieged the citadel, where Mawsuf and his troops were ensconced, while Thu'ban and his garrison barricaded themselves in the governor's palace at the foot of the citadel. By 13 March, Salih entered the palace and allowed the townspeople to loot it. As his Bedouin troops were not accustomed to siege warfare, he requested skilled forces from the Byzantine governor of Antioch, Constantine Dalassenos, who dispatched three hundred bowmen to Aleppo; the troops were soon after recalled on the orders of Basil II, who did not support Salih's rebellion. On 5 May, Salih appointed Ibn Mustafad muqaddam al-aḥdāth (commander of the urban militia) and governor of Aleppo, entrusting him and Ibn Tawq with continuing the siege, while Salih left for Palestine to help the Tayy combat a renewed expedition by Anushtakin. The Fatimid garrison's appeal for a truce on 6 June was ignored, prompting their desperate calls for Byzantine assistance; the troops went so far as to hang Christian crosses on the citadel walls and loudly praise Basil II while cursing Caliph az-Zahir. Muslim townsmen reacted to the pro-Byzantine pleas by joining the siege. By 30 June, the citadel was breached and Mawsuf and Thu'ban were arrested.

Meanwhile, Salih and the Tayy had fended off Fatimid troops in Palestine. On his way back to Aleppo, Salih captured a string of towns and fortresses, namely Baalbek west of Damascus, Homs and Rafaniyya in central Syria, Sidon on the Mediterranean coast and Hisn Ibn Akkar in the hinterland of Tripoli. These strategically valuable towns gave Salih's emirate an outlet to the sea and control over part of the trade route between Aleppo and Damascus. The fall of Sidon, in particular, alarmed the Fatimids, who had largely prioritized control of Syria's port cities over the inland towns and feared that other ports would subsequently recognize Bedouin rule. In September, Salih entered Aleppo's citadel victoriously. Afterward, he had Mawsuf and Ibn Abi Usama executed, and confiscated the estates of numerous upper class Aleppines. He released Thu'ban in return for financial compensation and allowed the city's dāʿī (chief Isma'ili propagandist) to depart safely.

== Emir of Aleppo ==
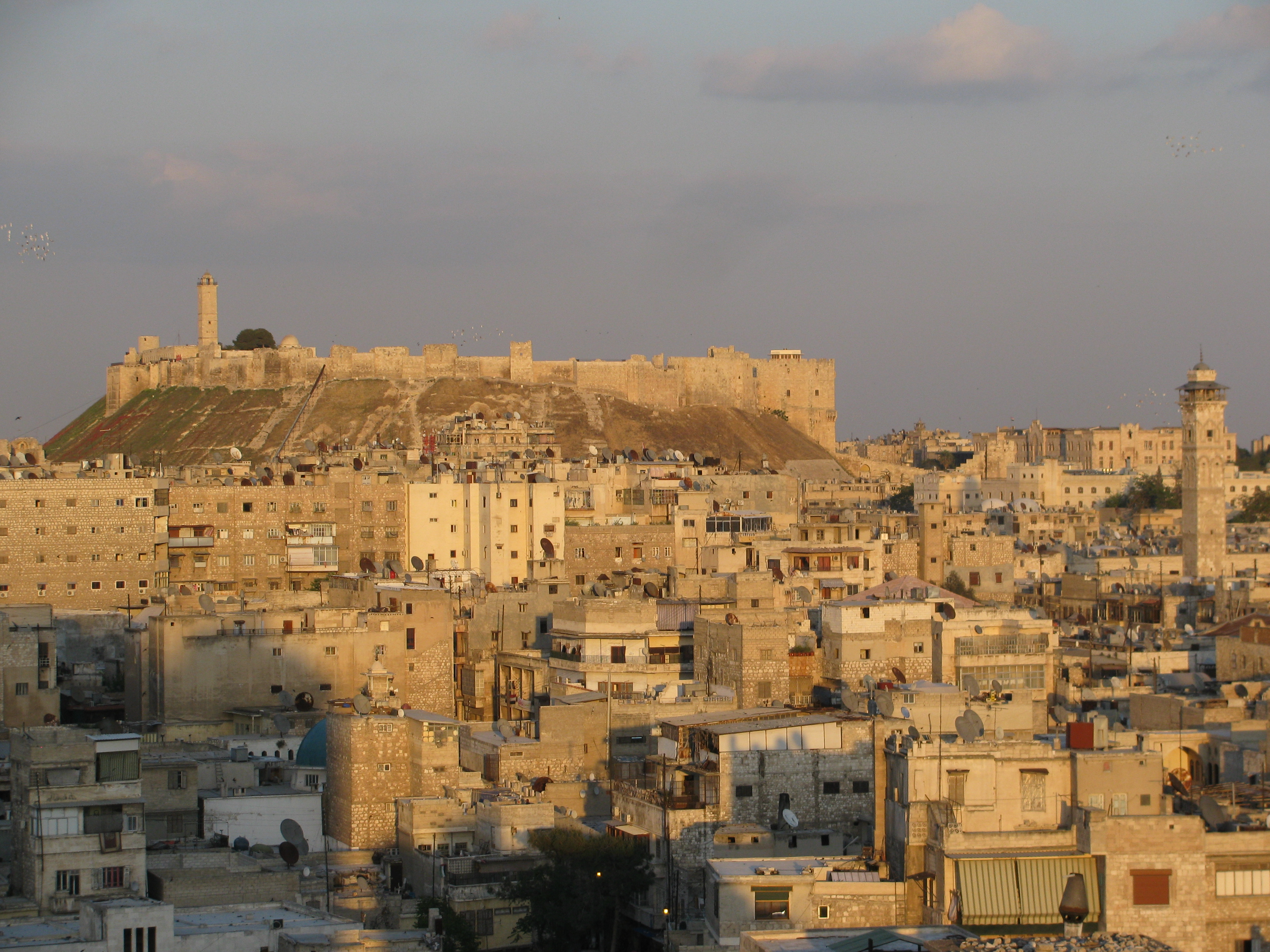
General view of old Aleppo (foreground) and its citadel (background), 2008. Aleppo was the capital of Salih's Mirdasid emirate. The citadel as depicted in the photograph dates to the 12th century.

Despite his rebellion, Salih paid formal allegiance to the Fatimid Caliphate after conquering Aleppo, and dispatched Ibn Tawq to meet az-Zahir in Cairo; in turn, az-Zahir officially recognized Salih's Mirdasid emirate and sent him numerous robes of honor and presents. There is no information about the Byzantines' relationship with Salih following the conquest of Aleppo, though Basil II refused to back Salih's rebellion when he appealed for support.

=== Administration ===
According to the 13th-century historian Ibn al-Amid, "Salih put in order all [the state] matters and adopted the way of justice". Salih organized his emirate along the typical lines of a medieval Islamic state. To that end, he maintained the fiscal administration, appointed a vizier to administer civilian and military affairs, and a Shia qāḍī to oversee judicial matters. He also appointed deputies to govern Sidon, Baalbek, Homs, Rafaniyya and Hisn Ibn Akkar. His vizier was a Christian named Tadhrus ibn al-Hasan, who wielded considerable influence over him, according to the 13th-century Aleppine historian Ibn al-Adim, and accompanied Salih on all of his military campaigns. Aleppine Christians would largely monopolize the post of vizier under later Mirdasid rulers, and members of the community managed significant parts of the emirate's economy. Their major role in the emirate indicated Salih's reliance on local Christian support, the existence of a large Christian minority in Aleppo and an effort to establish friendly ties with the Byzantines. The influence of Tadhrus in securing Christian interests provoked communal tensions in the emirate. Amid Muslim–Christian clashes in Ma'arrat al-Nu'man in 1026/27, Salih imprisoned Muslim notables from the town on charges of razing a winehouse whose Christian owner was accused by a Muslim woman of molesting her. Salih later released them after the intercession of the poet al-Ma'arri, whose brother was among the prisoners.

Information is largely absent regarding any major administrative changes Salih made to the Emirate of Aleppo. His only known institutional innovation was the post of shaykh al-dawla (chieftain of the state) or raʾīs al-balad (municipal chief), who came from a prominent leading family and served as Salih's trusted confidant and permanent representative with the people of Aleppo. The post emulated that of the sheikh, who played a secondary role to an emir in a princely Kilabi clan. Salih appointed Ibn Mustafad to the post and utilized the latter's aḥdāth, which consisted of armed young men from the city's lower and middle classes, as a police force. Although they cooperated with Salih, the aḥdāth were still an independent force. Sometime during his reign, Salih also acquired some Turkish ghilmān, though details about them are lacking in the sources.

=== Influence over the Bedouin ===
According to historian Thierry Bianquis, Salih had "brought to success the plan which guided his [Kilabi] forebears for a century", and that he ruled with "concern for order and respectability". At its core, Salih's emirate was held together by Kilabi tribal solidarity, and indeed the Kilab were the backbone of the Mirdasid army. Though Salih previously established his paramountcy over the Kilabi chieftains, the Mirdasids were not the only princely clan of the tribe and several emirs from other clans demanded a stake in the emirate. Salih granted each of these emirs an iqṭāʿ (fief; pl. iqṭāʿat), though details about the size or specific holders of the iqṭāʿat are absent in contemporary sources.

Bedouin customs were a conspicuous feature of Salih's rule, and he always appeared publicly in the garb of a Bedouin chieftain rather than that of an urban leader. Moreover, Salih preferred to live in his tribal camp in the outskirts of Aleppo rather than the city itself. After his establishment in Aleppo, Salih's status increased among the Bedouin of Syria and the Jazira. He was sometimes referred to by Arabic chroniclers as amīr ʿarab al-Shām (commander of the Bedouin of Syria). The value of this title in Salih's time is unclear, but it "at least indicate[d] the high position of its holder", according to Zakkar.

Besides his leadership of the Kilab and influence over the Tayy and Kalb in Syria, Salih's influence also extended to tribes in the Jazira, including the Numayr. When two Numayri emirs lost Edessa to Nasr al-Dawla, the Marwanid emir of Mayyafariqin, they appealed for Salih's intervention; accordingly, he persuaded Nasr to restore Edessa to the Numayr. Furthermore, the Banu Munqidh first emerged as a political force in the Orontes valley under his patronage in 1024/25. At that time, Salih awarded the Munqhidi chieftain Muqallad ibn Nasr ibn Munqidh the feudal lands around Shayzar as an iqṭāʿ for supporting his conquest of Aleppo, but the town of Shayzar itself was controlled by the Byzantines.

== Death and aftermath ==
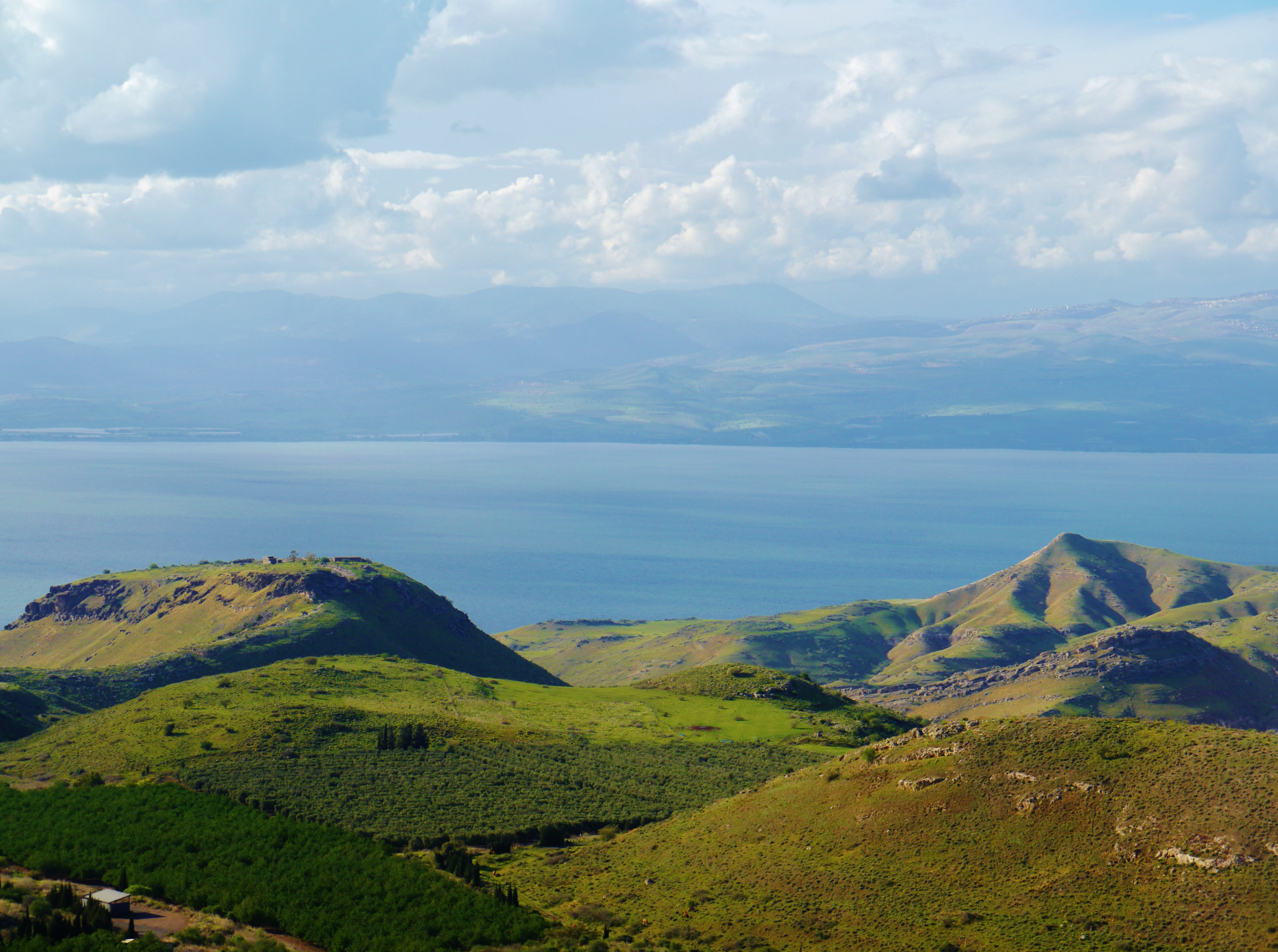
Salih was killed in battle near the eastern shore of Lake Tiberias (pictured in 2014).

Between 1025 and 1028, the Fatimids reached an agreement with Salih's Jarrahid/Tayyi allies, allowing them to maintain their foothold in interior Palestine, while Anushtakin was recalled to Cairo. In contrast to the Mirdasids, the Tayy consistently plundered their territory and its inhabitants. Moreover, the Fatimids would not permanently tolerate independent rule in Palestine: as Egypt's gateway to Southwest Asia, this posed a threat to the Caliphate's survival. Meanwhile, as the Fatimids regrouped, the Kalb had been repelled from Damascus, and in 1028, their emir died. He was replaced by his nephew, Rafi ibn Abi'l-Layl, who defected to the Fatimids, thus weakening the tripartite Bedouin alliance. In November 1028, Anushtakin returned to Palestine with a large Fatimid army and more horsemen from the Kalb and Banu Fazara to drive out the Tayy and evict the Mirdasids from central Syria.

With the Fatimids and Kalb poised against him, Hassan appealed for Salih's help to maintain their tribes' virtual autonomy throughout Syria against Fatimid encroachment. Accordingly, Salih mobilized his Kilabi forces to reinforce the Tayy in Palestine. The Bedouin leaders first encountered the Fatimid–Kalb army in the vicinity of Gaza, but, unable to halt their advance, they withdrew to the north. On 12 May or 25 May 1029, the two sides fought at al-Uqhuwana, on the eastern shores of Lake Tiberias. For unknown reasons, Hassan and his forces fled in the heat of battle, leaving Salih and his men to face Anushtakin's army alone. The Kilab were decisively defeated and Salih, his youngest son and his vizier were slain.

After the battle, Salih's head was sent to Cairo and put on display, while his body was nailed to the gateway of Sidon, a town he had enjoyed residing in. Al-Ma'arri expressed in verse his regret at the manner of Salih's death and the defeat of the Kilab, whom he refers to by one of its branches, the Dibab:

Ṣāliḥ has changed beyond recognition, and the Ḍibāb tribe of Qays are mere lizards (ḍibāb) who fear to be hunted.

The Fatimids proceeded to conquer Sidon, Baalbek, Homs, Rafaniyya and Hisn Ibn Akkar from Salih's deputy governors, who all fled. Salih had designated his second eldest son, Thimal, as his successor and left him in charge of Aleppo. His eldest son, Nasr, who fought at al-Uqhuwana, escaped the battle to wrest control of Aleppo. For a brief period, the two sons ruled Aleppo jointly with Nasr controlling the city and Thimal the citadel, until sometime in 1030 when Nasr compelled Thimal to relocate to al-Rahba. In 1038, Anushtakin killed Nasr and seized Aleppo, but Thimal later restored Mirdasid rule in the city, which continued, with occasional interruption, until 1080. The fall of the Mirdasids was followed by the reign of the Uqaylid Arab prince Muslim ibn Quraysh whose death in battle against the Seljuk Turks in 1085 signaled the definitive end of Arab rule in Aleppo, the virtual disappearance of Arab tribes from Syria's political scene and their replacement by Turkish and Kurdish dynasties.

== See also ==
- Sayf al-Dawla, founder of the Hamdanid emirate of Aleppo

== Bibliography ==
- Amabe, Fukuzo (2016). Urban Autonomy in Medieval Islam: Damascus, Aleppo, Cordoba, Toledo, Valencia and Tunis. Leiden: Brill. ISBN 978-90-04-31598-3.
- Bianquis, Thierry (1993). "Mirdās, Banū or Mirdāsids". In Bosworth, C. E.; van Donzel, E.; Heinrichs, W. P. & Pellat, Ch. (eds.). The Encyclopaedia of Islam, Second Edition. Volume VII: Mif–Naz. Leiden: E. J. Brill. pp. 115–123. doi:10.1163/1573-3912_islam_SIM_5220. ISBN 978-90-04-09419-2.
- Crawford, Robert W. (April–June 1953). "Reconstruction of a Struggle within the Mirdāsid Dynasty in Ḥalab". Journal of the American Oriental Society. 73 (2): 89–95. doi:10.2307/595365. JSTOR 595365.
- De Slane, Mac Guckin (1842). Ibn Khallikan's Biographical Dictionary, Volume 1. Paris: Oriental Translation Fund of Great Britain and Ireland. p. 631.
- Kennedy, Hugh N. (2004). The Prophet and the Age of the Caliphates: The Islamic Near East from the 6th to the 11th Century (Second ed.). Harlow: Pearson Education Limited. ISBN 978-0-582-40525-7.
- Lev, Yaacov (2009) [2003]. "Turks in the Political and Military Life of Eleventh-Century Egypt and Syria". In Hidemitsu, Kuroki (ed.). The Influence of Human Mobility in Muslim Societies (Second ed.). London and New York: Kegan Paul. ISBN 978-0-7103-0802-3.(subscription required)
- Mouton, J. M. (1997). "Shayzar". In Bosworth, C. E.; van Donzel, E.; Heinrichs, W. P. & Lecomte, G. (eds.). The Encyclopaedia of Islam, Second Edition. Volume IX: San–Sze. Leiden: E. J. Brill. p. 411. doi:10.1163/1573-3912_islam_SIM_6901. ISBN 978-90-04-10422-8.
- Smoor, Pieter (1985). Kings and Bedouins in the Palace of Aleppo as Reflected in Maʻarrī's Works. Manchester: University of Manchester. ISBN 9780950788555.
- Smoor, Pieter (1986). "Al-Maʾarrī". In Bosworth, C. E.; van Donzel, E.; Lewis, B. & Pellat, Ch. (eds.). The Encyclopaedia of Islam, Second Edition. Volume V: Khe–Mahi. Leiden: E. J. Brill. pp. 927–935. doi:10.1163/1573-3912_islam_COM_0599. ISBN 978-90-04-07819-2.
- Sobernheim, M. (1936). "Mirdāsids". In Houtsma, M. Th.; Wensinck, A. J.; Levi-Provençal, E. (eds.). The Encyclopædia of Islam: A Dictionary of the Geography, Ethnography and Biography of the Muhammadan Peoples. Vol. III: L–R. Leiden: E. J. Brill. p. 515.
- Zakkar, Suhayl (1971). The Emirate of Aleppo: 1004–1094. Beirut: Dar al-Amanah. OCLC 759803726.

Preceded by Thu'ban ibn Muhammad as Fatimid governor of Aleppo	Emir of Aleppo; January 1024–May 1029	Succeeded by Shibl al-Dawla Nasr
