= Salim ibn Mustafad =

Abūʾl-Murajjā Sālim ibn al-Mustafād al-Ḥamdānī (died 1034) was the commander of Aleppo's ahdath (urban militia) during the reigns of the Mirdasid emirs Salih ibn Mirdas (r. 1024/25–1029) and Nasr ibn Salih (r. 1029–1038). He was executed by the latter in 1034 for stirring a local Muslim uprising against Aleppo's vassalage to the Christian Byzantine Empire.

== Life ==
Salim ibn al-Mustafad was the son of a ghulam (slave soldier; pl. ghilman) of Sayf al-Dawla, the Hamdanid emir of Aleppo in 945–967. Ibn al-Mustafad was a leader of the surviving Hamdanid-era ghilman when the Fatimids directly ruled Aleppo in the early 1020s. Though of foreign origins, Ibn al-Mustafad was assimilated into the Aleppine populace and resided in the al-Zajjajin (glassmakers) quarter where he likely cultivated close relationships with craftsmen, minor traders and laborers.

Ibn al-Mustafad defected to the Bedouin rebel Salih ibn Mirdas when the latter besieged Aleppo in 1024. Ibn al-Mustafad rallied the ghilman and local residents and opened the Bab Qinnasrin gate to Salih's Kilabi forces on 18 January 1025. In turn, Salih guaranteed the residents' safety and appointed Ibn al-Mustafad as ra'is al-balad (municipal chief) and muqaddam al-ahdath (commander of the local militia). The ahdath consisted of young armed men from Aleppo's lower and middle-class neighborhoods. Salih then entrusted Ibn al-Mustafad and Sulayman ibn Tawq with overseeing the siege of the Aleppo Citadel where the Fatimid garrison was holed up. The latter surrendered on 30 June and all of Aleppo came under Salih's Mirdasid emirate.

After Salih died, his sons Nasr and Thimal succeeded him, until the former seized complete control of Aleppo in 1030 following the Mirdasid victory over the Byzantines at the Battle of Azaz. Ibn al-Mustafad remained in charge of the ahdath, but he opposed Nasr's move to make the Emirate of Aleppo a formal vassal of the Byzantine Empire in 1031. He stirred up the city's poor and middle class Muslims to protest the alliance with Byzantium, prompting the Byzantine governor of Antioch to demand Nasr execute Ibn al-Mustafad. Accordingly, he was captured and executed in 1034. It is not apparent in contemporary sources if anyone succeeded Ibn al-Mustafad as commander of the ahdath.

== Bibliography ==
- Amabe, Fukuzo (2016). Urban Autonomy in Medieval Islam: Damascus, Aleppo, Cordoba, Toledo, Valencia and Tunis. Leiden: Brill.
- Bianquis, Thierry (1993). "Mirdās". In Bosworth, C. E.; van Donzel, E.; Heinrichs, W. P. & Pellat, Ch. (eds.). The Encyclopaedia of Islam, Second Edition. Volume VII: Mif–Naz. Leiden: E. J. Brill. pp. 115–123. ISBN 978-90-04-09419-2.
- Zakkar, Suhayl (1971). The Emirate of Aleppo: 1004–1094. Aleppo: Dar al-Amanah.
