= Latmin =

Latmin لطمين
- Village
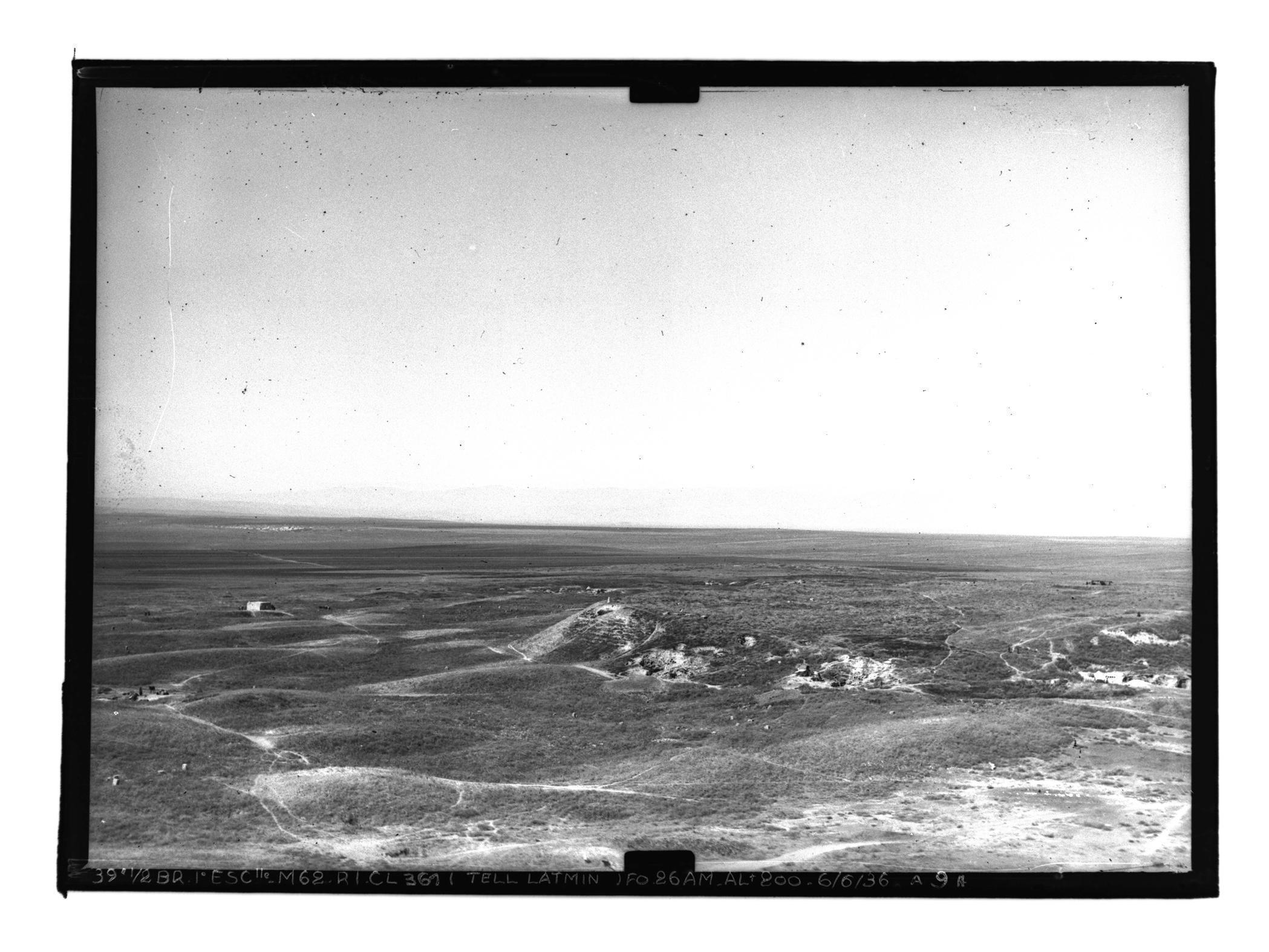
- 1936 aerial view of Latmin

- Location in Syria
- Coordinates: 35°21′30″N 36°39′13″E
- Country: Syria
- Governorate: Hama
- District: Mahardah
- Subdistrict: Kafr Zita

Population (2004)
  - Total: 1,113
- Time zone: UTC+3 (AST)
- City Qrya Pcode: C3464

Latmin (Arabic: لطمين) is a Syrian village located in the Kafr Zita Subdistrict of the Mahardah District in Hama Governorate. According to the Syria Central Bureau of Statistics (CBS), Latmin had a population of 1,113 in the 2004 census.

== History ==
The medieval Muslim geographer al-Yaqubi mentions a village named al-Atmim as being part of Jund Hims (military district of Homs) in the 9th-century. This village corresponds with the artificial mound of Tell Latmin. The Crusaders captured it in the early 11th-century. However, following the decisive victory of a Muslim alliance at the Battle of Harran in May 1104, Latmin was restored to Muslim control, falling to the kingdom of Ridwan of Aleppo. The Crusader garrison in the village fled back to the Principality of Antioch, which experienced a severe territorial loss in the interior region of northwestern Syria in the aftermath of the battle. The Crusader forces of the Principality recaptured the village when Ridwan's forces were defeated in the Battle of Artah in April 1105. In the 1220s, during Ayyubid rule, the Syrian geographer Yaqut al-Hamawi noted that Latmin was "a district with a fortress in it," belonging to Hims Province. On 30 November 2024, HTS rebels captured the city from the Syrian Army.

== Bibliography ==
- Asbridge, Thomas S. (2000). The Creation of the Principality of Antioch: 1098-1130. Boydell & Brewer Ltd. ISBN 0851156614.
- Lipinsky, Edward (2006). On the Skirts of Canaan in the Iron Age: Historical and Topographical Researches. Peeters Publishers. ISBN 9042917989.
- Setton, Kenneth Meyer (2006). A History of the Crusades: The First Hundred Years. University of Wisconsin Press. ISBN 0299048349.
- le Strange, Guy (1890). Palestine Under the Moslems: A Description of Syria and the Holy Land from A.D. 650 to 1500. Committee of the Palestine Exploration Fund.
