= Ahdath =

- Active: 10th to 12th centuries
- Country: Syria

The ahdath (Arabic: الأحداث, romanized: al-aḥdāth) were local militias of irregular police in Syria in the 10th to 12th centuries. They maintained order and protected cities from outside domination. Some later writers ascribed them proletarian values, as outlets of the popular will. Most fulfilled a more formal police function and in many cases worked with the urban bourgeoisie. They helped the Fatimid Caliphate in Syria defend against the Crusaders.
