= Bab Qinnasrin =

Coordinates: 36°11′40″N 37°9′20″E

- بَاب قِنَّسْرِيْن
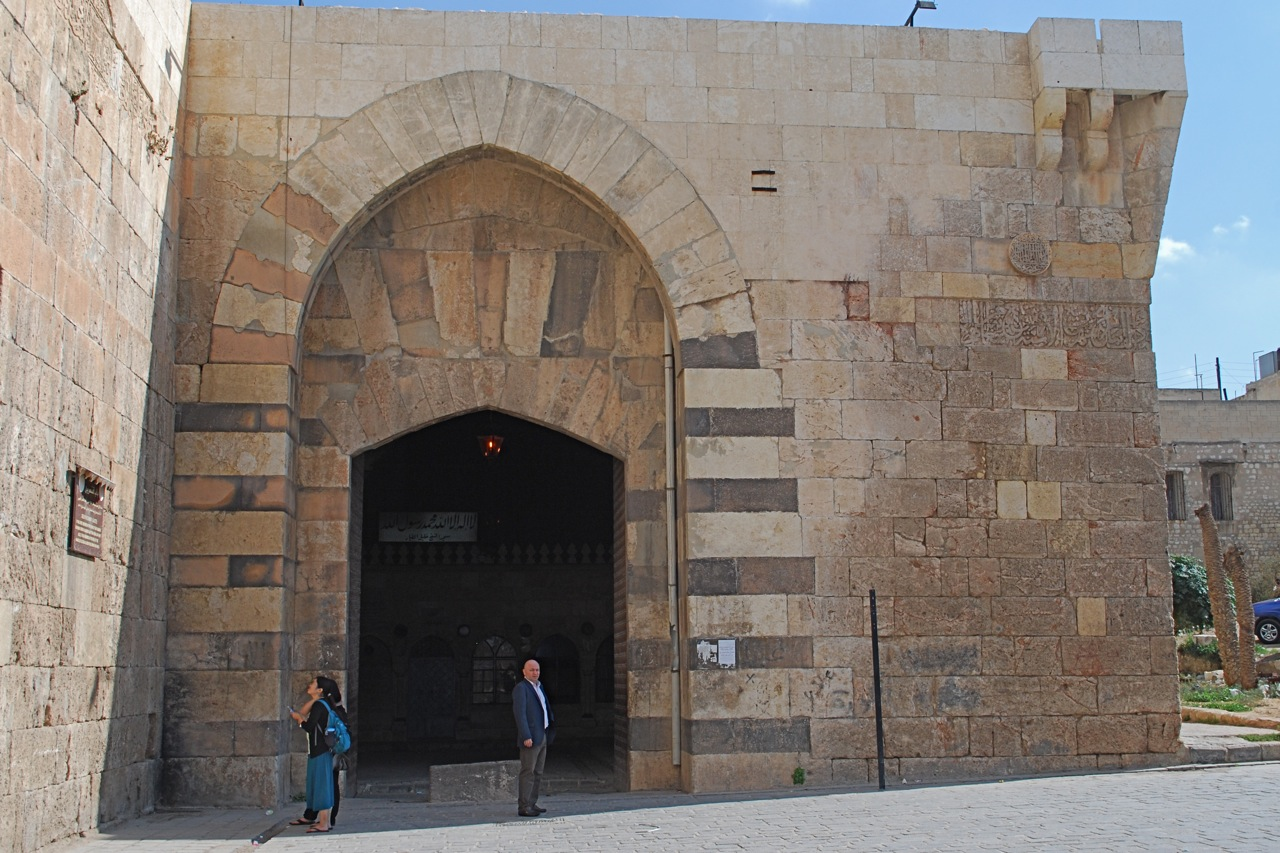
- Bab Qinnasrin in 2010

General information
- Status: restored
- Type: City gate
- Architectural style: Islamic architecture
- Town or city: Aleppo
- Country: Syria
- Completed: 964, 1256
- Owner: Sayf al-Dawla
- Known for: One of the 9 main gates of the ancient city walls of Aleppo

Bab Qinnasrin (Arabic: بَاب قِنَّسْرِيْن, romanized: Bāb Qinnasrīn), meaning the Gate of Qinnasrin is one of the gates of the medieval Old City of Aleppo in northern Syria. In its present form, it dates to 1256.

== History ==
The gate was originally built by the Hamdanid ruler Sayf al-Dawla in 964, and fitted with the doors of the gate of Amorium, taken as spoils by Caliph al-Mu'tasim after his sack of the city in 838. Al-Mu'tasim installed them at the entrance of his palace in Samarra, until they were taken, probably towards the end of the 9th century, and installed at Raqqa, whence Sayf al-Dawla in turn took them.

Significant damage to the gate occurred as part of armed conflict in Aleppo during the Syrian war.
