= Safiyy al-Dawla =

Fatimid governor of Aleppo from 1022 to 1023

Safiyy al-Dawla Muhammad ibn Ali ibn Ja'far ibn Falah

Fatimid Governor of Aleppo
- In office 10 October 1022 – 10 April 1023
- Appointed by: Az-Zahir
- Lieutenant: Yumn al-Dawla Sa'adat (governor of the citadel)
- Preceded by: Abu'l-Najm Badr
- Succeeded by: Sanad al-Dawla Hasan

Ṣafiyy al-Dawla Muḥammad ibn ʿAli ibn Jaʾfar ibn Falāh (Arabic: صفي الدولة محمد بن علي بن جعفر بن فلاح) was the Fatimid governor of Aleppo between October 1022 and April 1023. He was specifically assigned to govern the city, while the citadel of Aleppo was assigned to a separate governor, the eunuch Yumn al-Dawla Sa'adat. This marked the first time the Fatimids appointed separate rulers for the city and citadel of Aleppo since they gained direct control over the city in October 1016. Safiyy al-Dawla belonged to the Kutama, a militant Berber group that had been Arabized and played a major role in the Fatimid military. He was the son of Ali ibn Ja'far and grandson of Ja'far ibn Fallah, both of whom were Fatimid generals. He was bestowed with the title ṣafiyy al-dawla (chosen of the State). Safiyy al-Dawla and Yumn al-Dawla were appointed to Aleppo to replace Abu'l-Najm Badr. Nothing is known about their reign and Safiyy al-Dawla was dismissed in April 1023, and succeeded by Sanad al-Dawla Hasan.

== Bibliography ==
- Zakkar, Suhayl (1971). The Emirate of Aleppo: 1004–1094. Aleppo: Dar al-Amanah.

Preceded by Abu'l-Najm Badr	Emir of Aleppo; October 1022–April 1023	Succeeded by Sanad al-Dawla Hasan
