= Abu'l-Najm Badr =

Assassin of Fatimid governor of Aleppo, Aziz al-Dawla in 1022

Wafiyy al-Dawla wa-Aminahā Abūʾl-Najm Badr

Fatimid Governor of Aleppo
- In office July 1022 – October 1022
- Appointed by: Az-Zahir
- Preceded by: Aziz al-Dawla
- Succeeded by: Safiyy al-Dawla

Wafiyy al-Dawla wa-Aminahā Abūʾl-Najm Badr, also known as Badr al-Kabīr, was the ghulām (slave soldier) who assassinated the Fatimid governor of Aleppo, Aziz al-Dawla, and replaced him as governor for three months in 1022. The assassination was apparently a conspiracy between Badr and the Fatimid court under Sitt al-Mulk. Badr was ultimately forced to relinquish his post and arrested shortly thereafter.

== Life ==
Badr was either of Turkish or Armenian origins. He was originally a ghulām (slave soldier; pl. ghilmān) of the Fatimid governor of Damascus, Manjutakin, until being acquired by Aziz al-Dawla Fatik; the latter was also a former Armenian ghulām of Manjutakin. During Aziz al-Dawla's reign as the Fatimid governor of Aleppo, beginning in 1017, he appointed Badr as the commander of the ghilmān and governor of the Aleppo Citadel. This demonstrated that Aziz al-Dawla placed significant trust in Badr.

Aziz al-Dawla ruled with virtual independence and maintained his own relations with the Byzantine Empire, Aleppo's powerful, northern neighbor and enemy of the Fatimids. This alarmed Sitt al-Mulk, the effective ruler of the Fatimids. Under her direction, the Fatimid court in Cairo sought to eliminate Aziz al-Dawla; to that end, Sitt al-Mulk conspired with Badr, sending him secretive correspondence, carried either by official envoys or anonymous merchants. According to historian Suhayl Zakkar, the secret letters to Badr may have been delivered by Fatimid envoys from Cairo carrying gifts to Aziz al-Dawla, which allowed them access to Badr.

Badr used Aziz al-Dawla's affection of another ghulām, an Indian named Tuzun, as an avenue to assassinate him. Badr warned Tuzun that Aziz al-Dawla had intended to kill him on several occasions only to be stopped by Badr's interjection. Badr won Tuzun's trust, and the latter, fearful of his own death at Aziz al-Dawla's hand, cooperated with Badr on a plot to assassinate their master. They decided to act on 6 July 1022. That day, Aziz al-Dawla had returned to his sleeping quarters after a day of hunting and drinking with Badr. In this intoxicated state, Aziz al-Dawla went to bed, and Tuzun, who typically attended to Aziz al-Dawla, took the latter's sword and struck off his head. Badr then betrayed Tuzun by letting out a yell accusing his co-conspirator of murdering their master. This gained the attention of the other ghilmān who attacked and killed Tuzun.

After the assassination, Badr reported Aziz al-Dawla's death to the Fatimid court, which publicly mourned the death of their Aleppine governor whilst they quietly rejoiced. Badr was appointed Aziz al-Dawla's replacement and was bestowed the title of wafiyy al-dawla wa-aminahā (loyal and trustworthy one of the state). According to Zakkar, the title is evidence of both Badr and the Fatimid court's role in the assassination. At the same time, Zakkar asserts that Sitt al-Mulk's role in the affair was "questionable", but this was the consensus of the medieval chroniclers.

Badr's appointment was effectively used by the Fatimids merely as a temporary arrangement until a more suitable candidate could be found. Badr was sent correspondence from Cairo via Ali ibn Ahmad al-Dayf of Afamiya to reassure him of the Caliphate's goodwill toward him. Nonetheless, in the meeting between Badr and al-Dayf, the former was persuade to relinquish the governorship, which he had officially held for ninety-six days. Badr's replacement, the Kutami officer, Safiyy al-Dawla, arrived in Aleppo on 10 October. According to Zakkar, after Badr gave up his post, "he was arrested and shortly after met his fate".

== Bibliography ==
- Dadoyan, Seta B. (2013). The Armenians in the Medieval Islamic World: Armenian Realpolitik in the Islamic World and Diverging Paradigms: Case of Cilicia Eleventh to Fourteenth Centuries. Transaction Publishers. ISBN 978-1-4128-4577-9.
- Zakkar, Suhayl (1971). The Emirate of Aleppo: 1004–1094. Aleppo: Dar al-Amanah.

Preceded by Aziz al-Dawla	Emir of Aleppo; July–October 1022	Succeeded by Safiyy al-Dawla
