= Fatik =

Fatik may refer to the following:

- Aziz al-Dawla, or Aziz al-Dawla Fatik, Armenian general and semi-independent Fatimid governor of Aleppo in 1016–1022
- Fatik, the fictional sleuth by Bengali author Shirshendu Mukhopadhyay
