= Al-Otrush Mosque =

Mosque in Aleppo, Syria

al-Otrush Mosque
- جَامِع الْأُطْرُوش
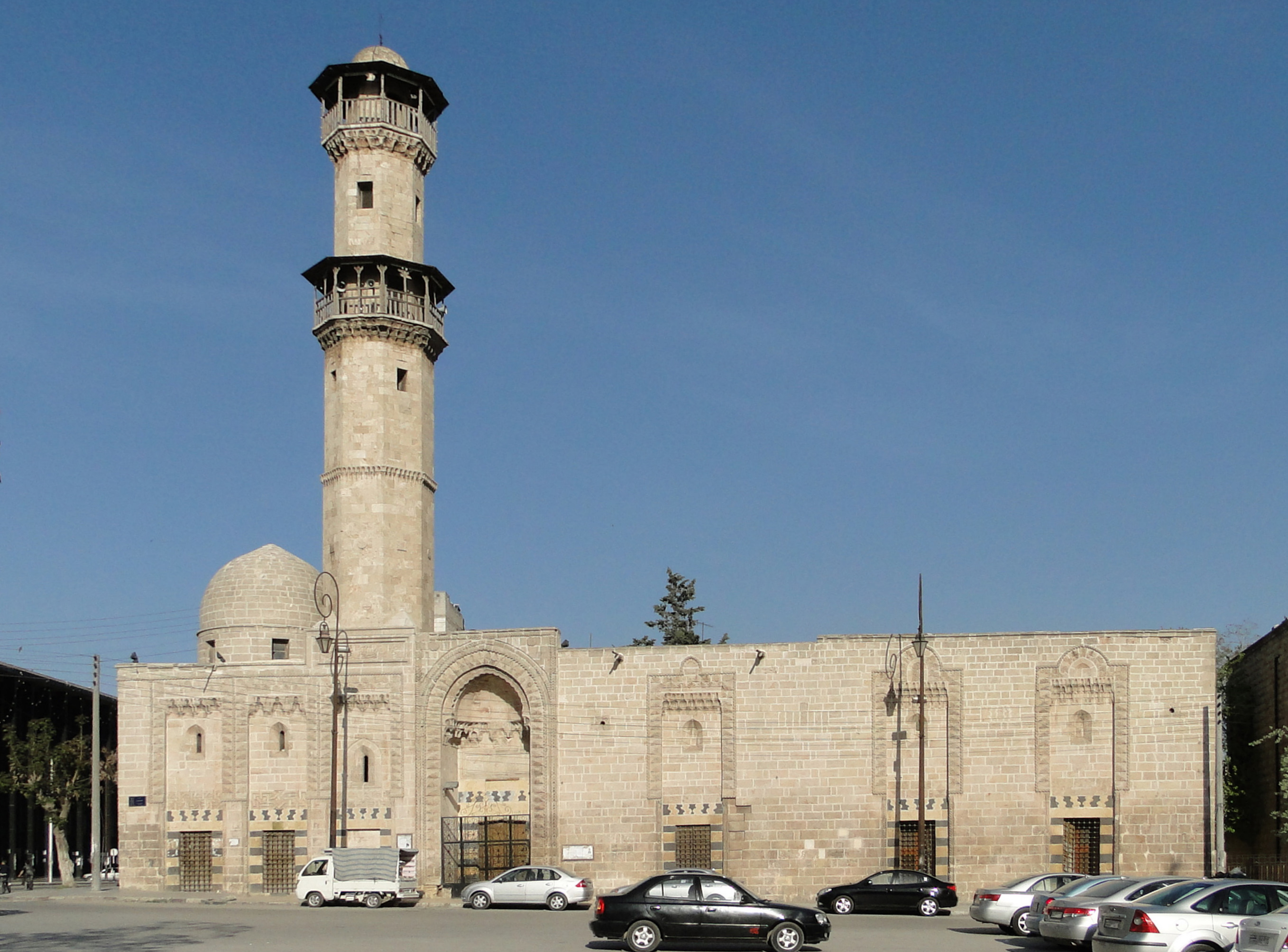
- The mosque and its minaret in 2010

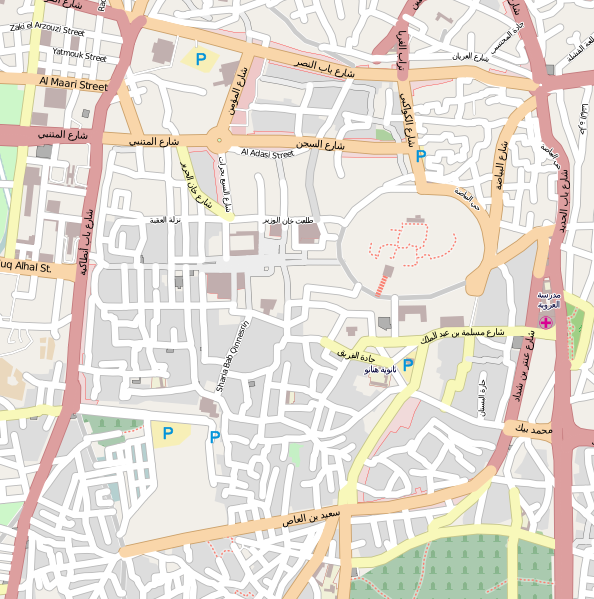
- Location of the mosque in the Ancient City of Aleppo

Religion
- Affiliation: Islam
- Ecclesiastical or organisational status: Mosque
- Status: Active

Location
- Location: al-A'jam district, Aleppo
- Country: Syria
- Interactive map of al-Otrush Mosque
- Coordinates: 36°11′46″N 37°09′48″E

Architecture
- Type: Islamic architecture
- Style: Mamluk
- Founder: Aqbogha al-Otrush; Demirdash al-Nasiri
- Completed: 1408 CE

Specifications
- Dome: 1
- Minaret: 1
- Materials: Stone
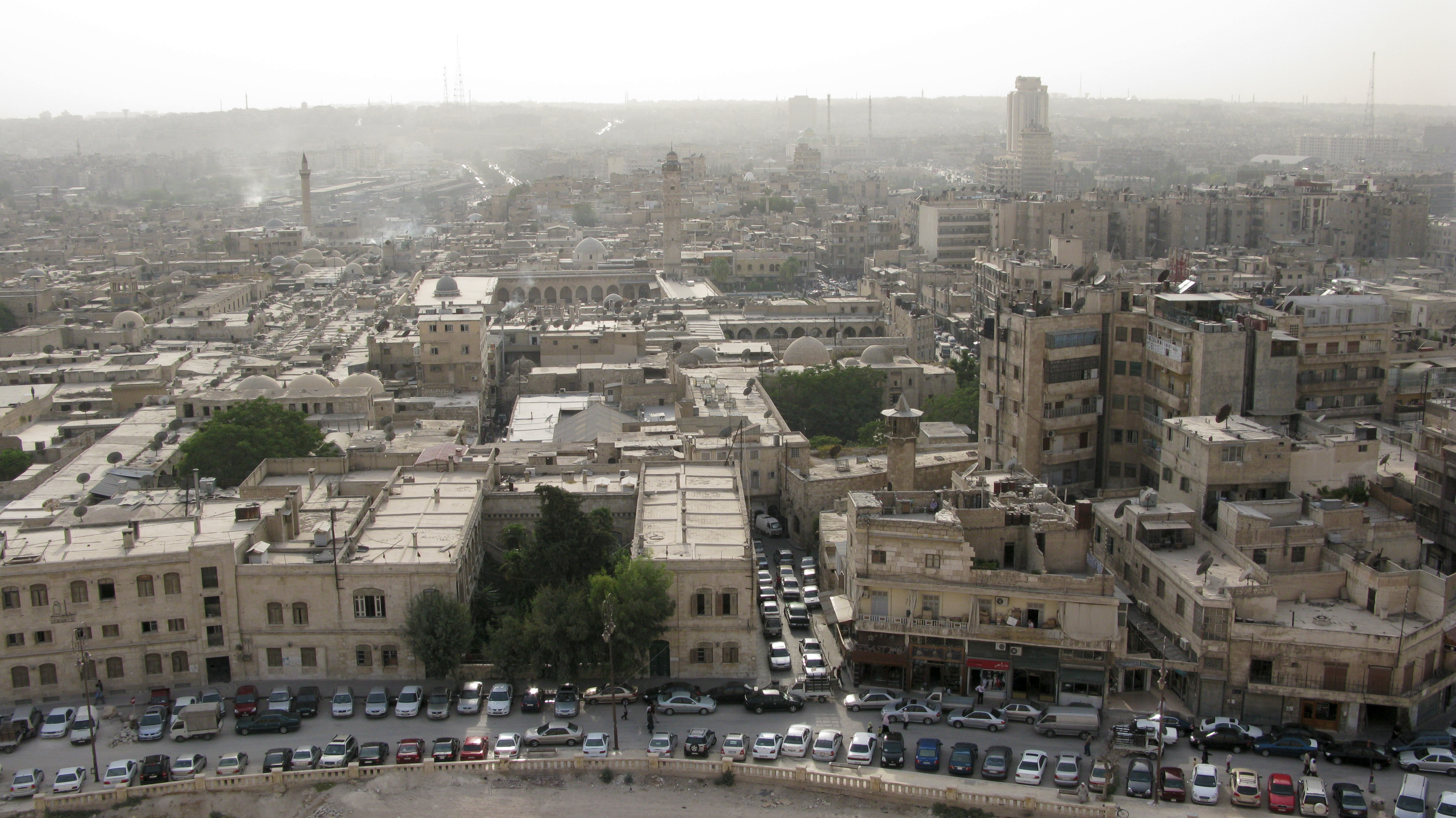
- Ancient Aleppo

UNESCO World Heritage Site
- Official name: Ancient City of Aleppo
- Location: Aleppo, Syria
- Includes: Citadel of Aleppo, Al-Madina Souq
- Criteria: Cultural: (iii), (iv)
- Reference: 21
- Inscription: 1986 (10th Session)
- Endangered: 2013–2020
- Area: 364 ha (1.41 sq mi)

The Al-Otrush Mosque (Arabic: جَامِع الْأُطْرُوش, romanized: Jāmiʿ al-ʾUṭrūš), also known as the Demirdash Mosque, is a mosque in Aleppo, Syria. It is located at the south of the Citadel, in "al-A'jam" district of the Ancient City, a World Heritage Site, near the Al-Sultaniyah Madrasa.

== Overview ==
Construction of the mosque was initiated in 1393 CE by the Mamluk ruler of Aleppo Aqbogha al-Otrush. However, he died five years later and the mosque was completed by his successor Demirdash al-Nasiri in 1408.

The mosque is famous for its decorated façade and its entrance which is topped with traditional oriental motifs and Islamic muqarnas. The mosque's minaret, located to the left of the main entrance, has a round octangular shape.

The mosque was renovated in 1922.

== Gallery ==
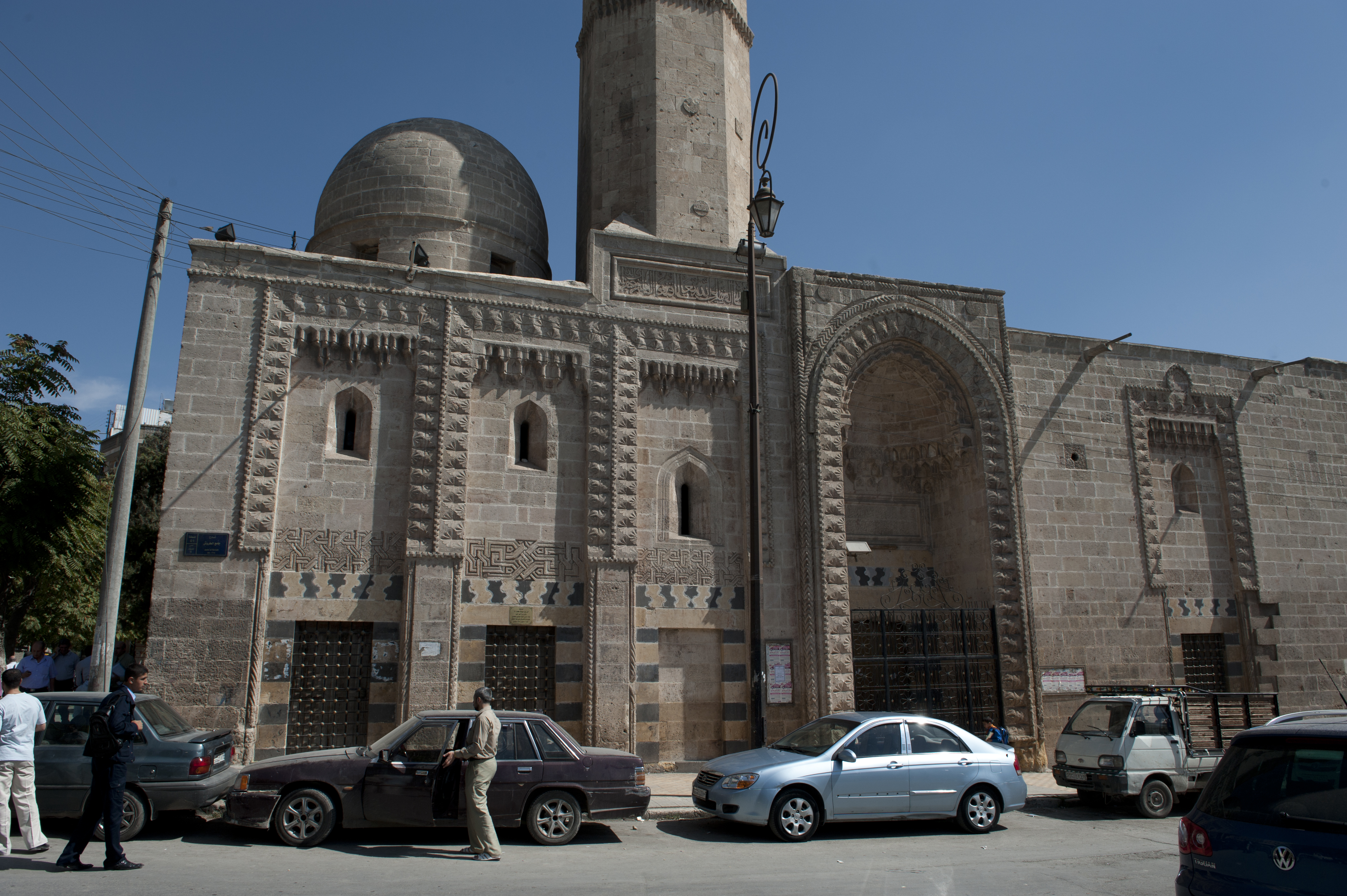
Exterior of the mosque

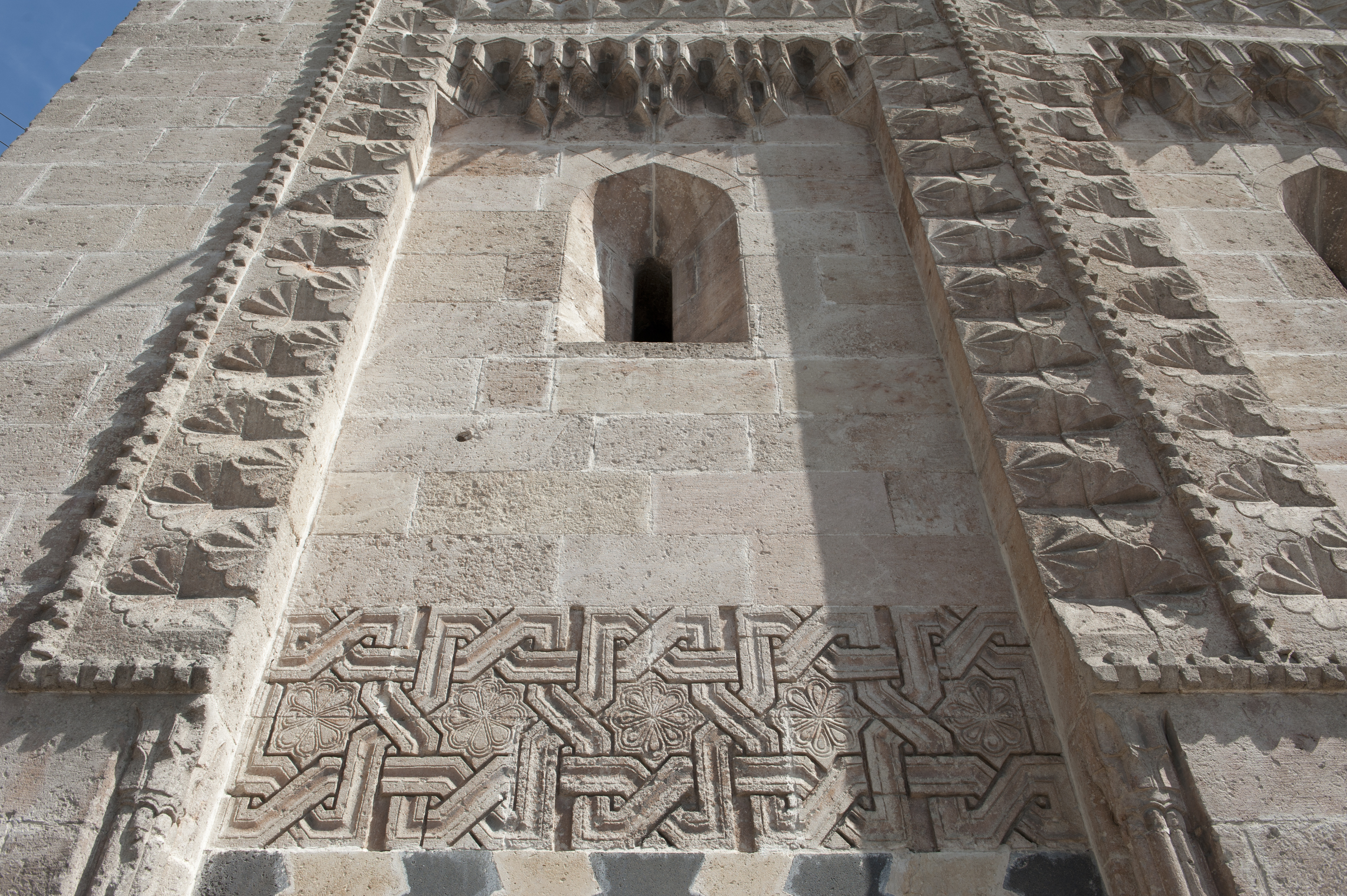
Detail of the mosque façade

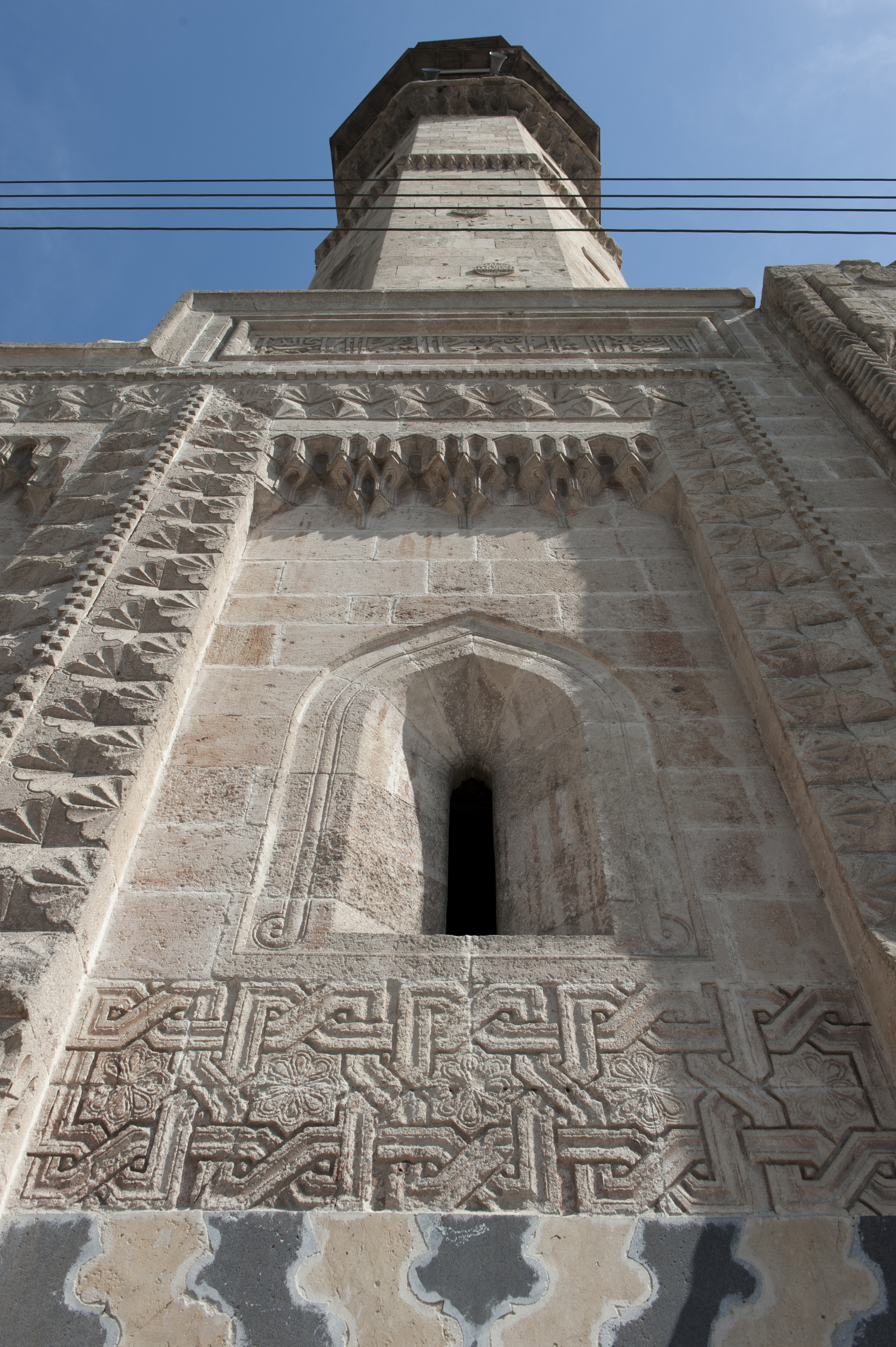
Detail of the mosque façade and minaret

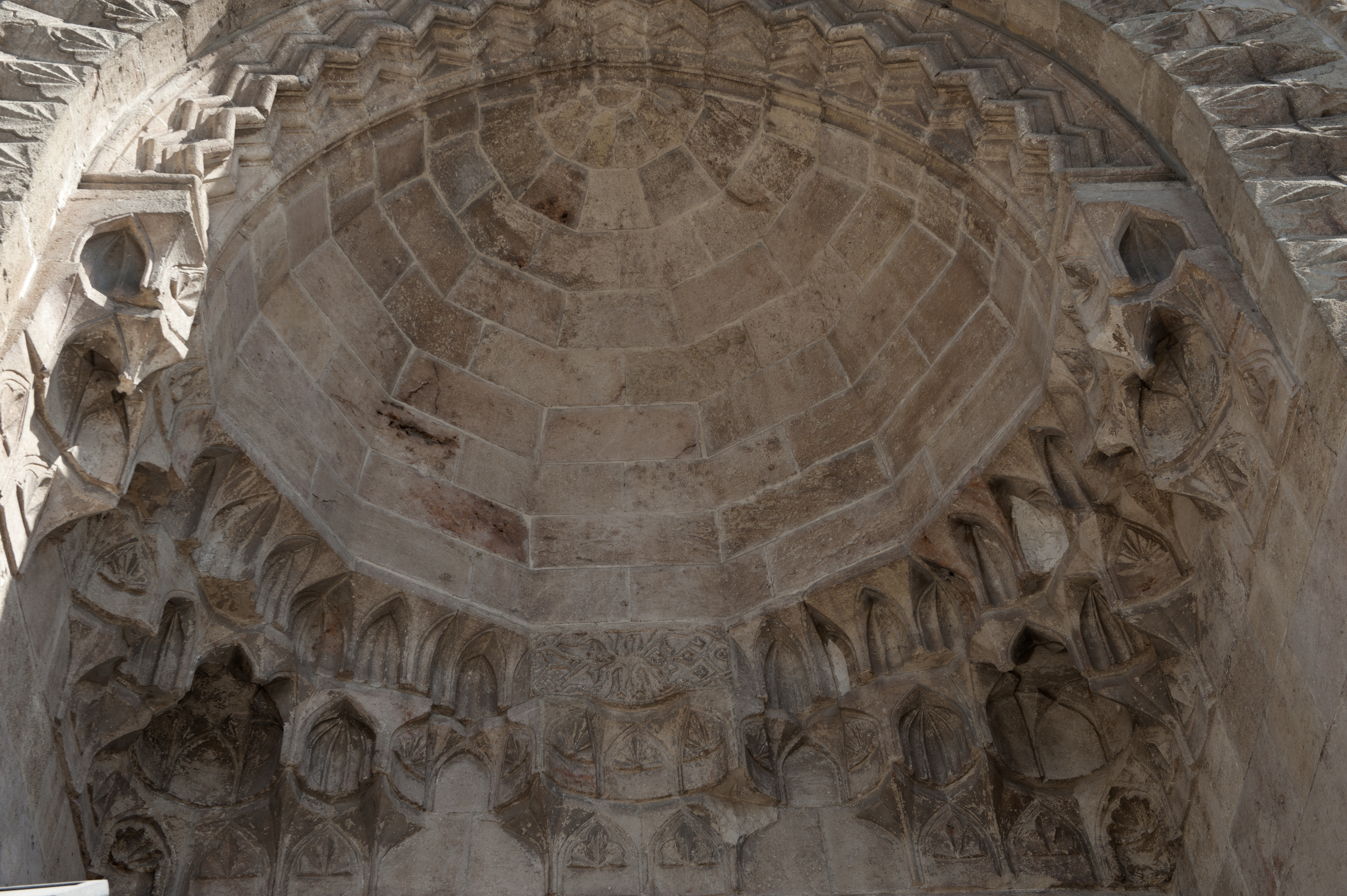
Detail of the mosque entrance

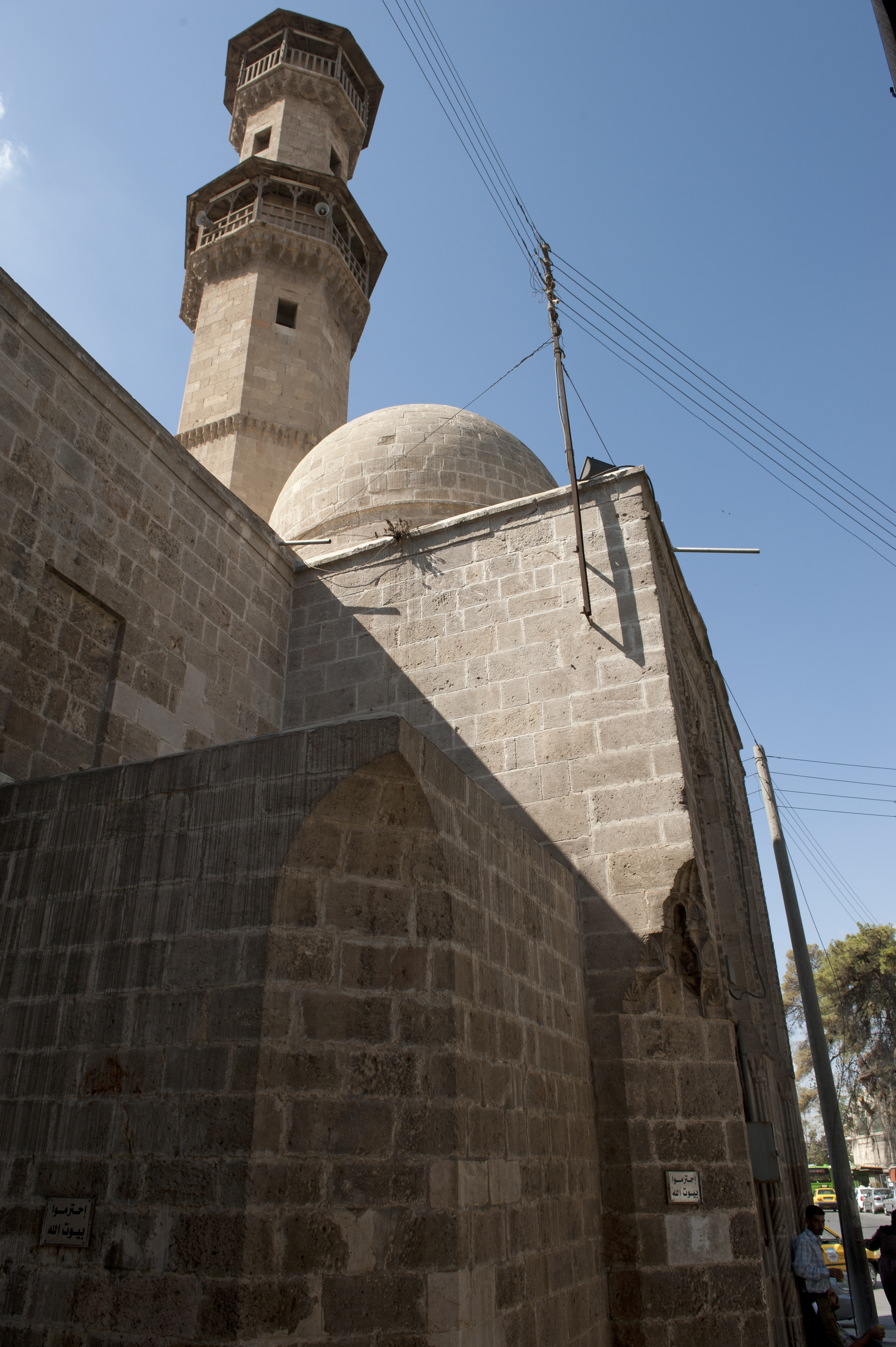
The mosque from the north

== See also ==
- Islam in Syria
- List of mosques in Aleppo
- List of mosques in Syria
