= Sultaniyya Madrasa =

Madrasa in Aleppo, Syria

Sultaniyya Mosque and Madrasa
- جَامِع ومَدْرَسَة السُّلْطَانِيَّة
- View of the Mosque and Madrasa from the Aleppo Citadel in 2009

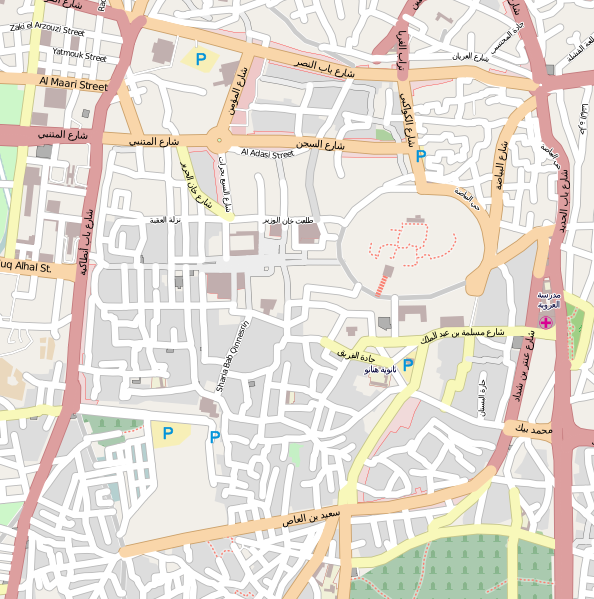
- Location of the mosque and madrasa in the Ancient City of Aleppo

Religion
- Affiliation: Islam
- Ecclesiastical or organisational status: Mosque
- Status: Destroyed (in partial ruins)

Location
- Location: Aleppo
- Country: Syria
- Interactive map of Sultaniyya Mosque and Madrasa
- Coordinates: 36°11′49.5″N 37°9′42″E

Architecture
- Type: Islamic architecture
- Style: Ayyubid
- Completed: 1223; 803 years ago

Specifications
- Dome: 2
- Minaret: 1
- Materials: Stone
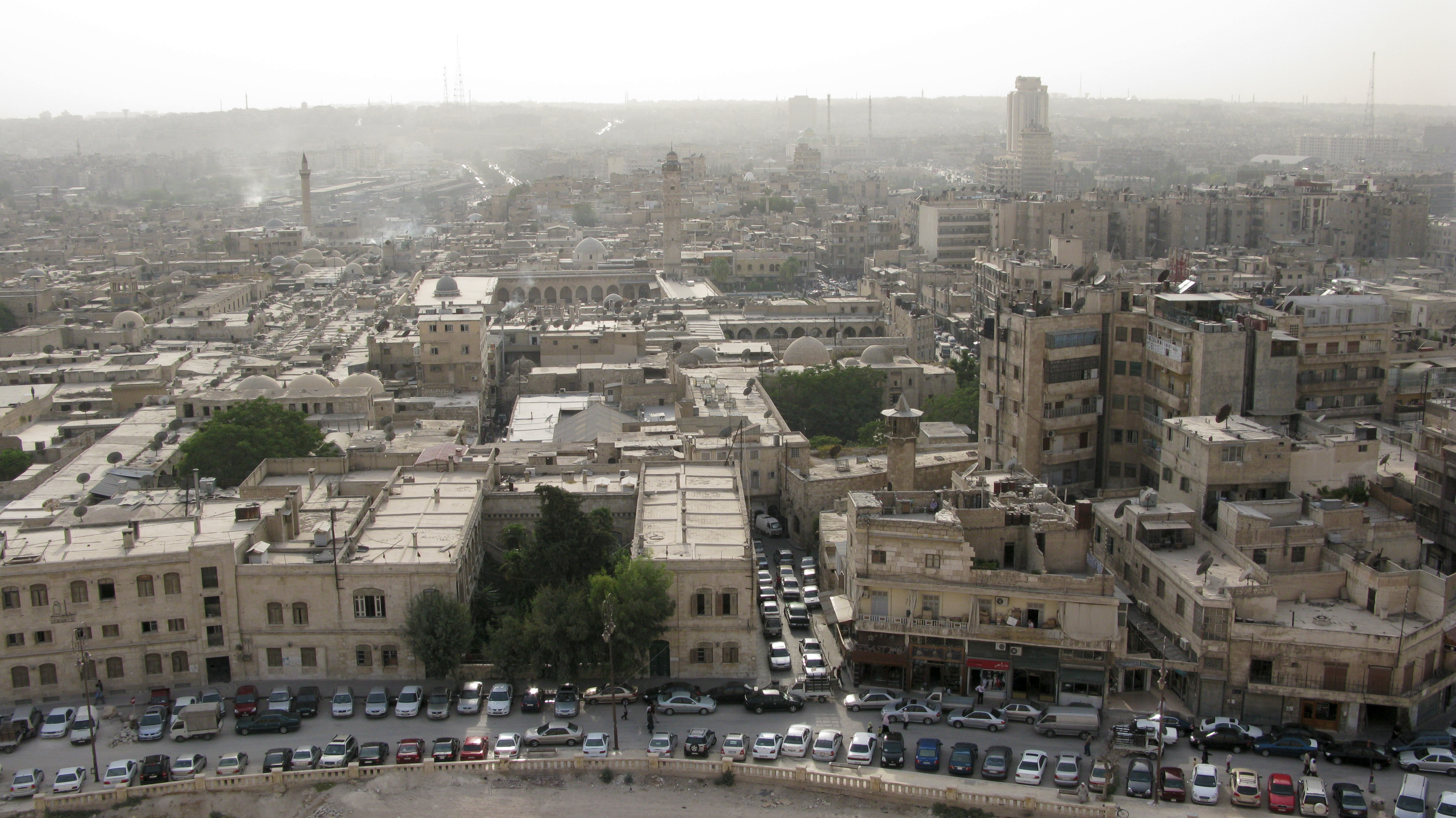
- Ancient Aleppo

UNESCO World Heritage Site
- Official name: Ancient City of Aleppo
- Location: Aleppo, Syria
- Includes: Citadel of Aleppo, Al-Madina Souq
- Criteria: Cultural: (iii), (iv)
- Reference: 21
- Inscription: 1986 (10th Session)
- Endangered: 2013–2020
- Area: 364 ha (1.41 sq mi)

The Sultaniyya Mosque and Madrasa, originally Sultaniyya Madrasa (Arabic: الْمَدْرَسَة السُّلْطَانِيَّة, romanized: al-Madrasa s-Sulṭāniyya), is a madrasa complex in Aleppo, Syria. It is located across from the Citadel entrance in the Ancient City of Aleppo, a World Heritage Site, near the Al-Otrush Mosque. The religious, educational and funerary complex contains the tomb of sultan Malik al-Zaher, the son of Ayyubid Sultan Saladin. However, satellite pictures show it was bombed out of existence. As of the end of 2025, reconstruction efforts were underway to restore the mosque.

== Gallery ==
Facade of the madrasa

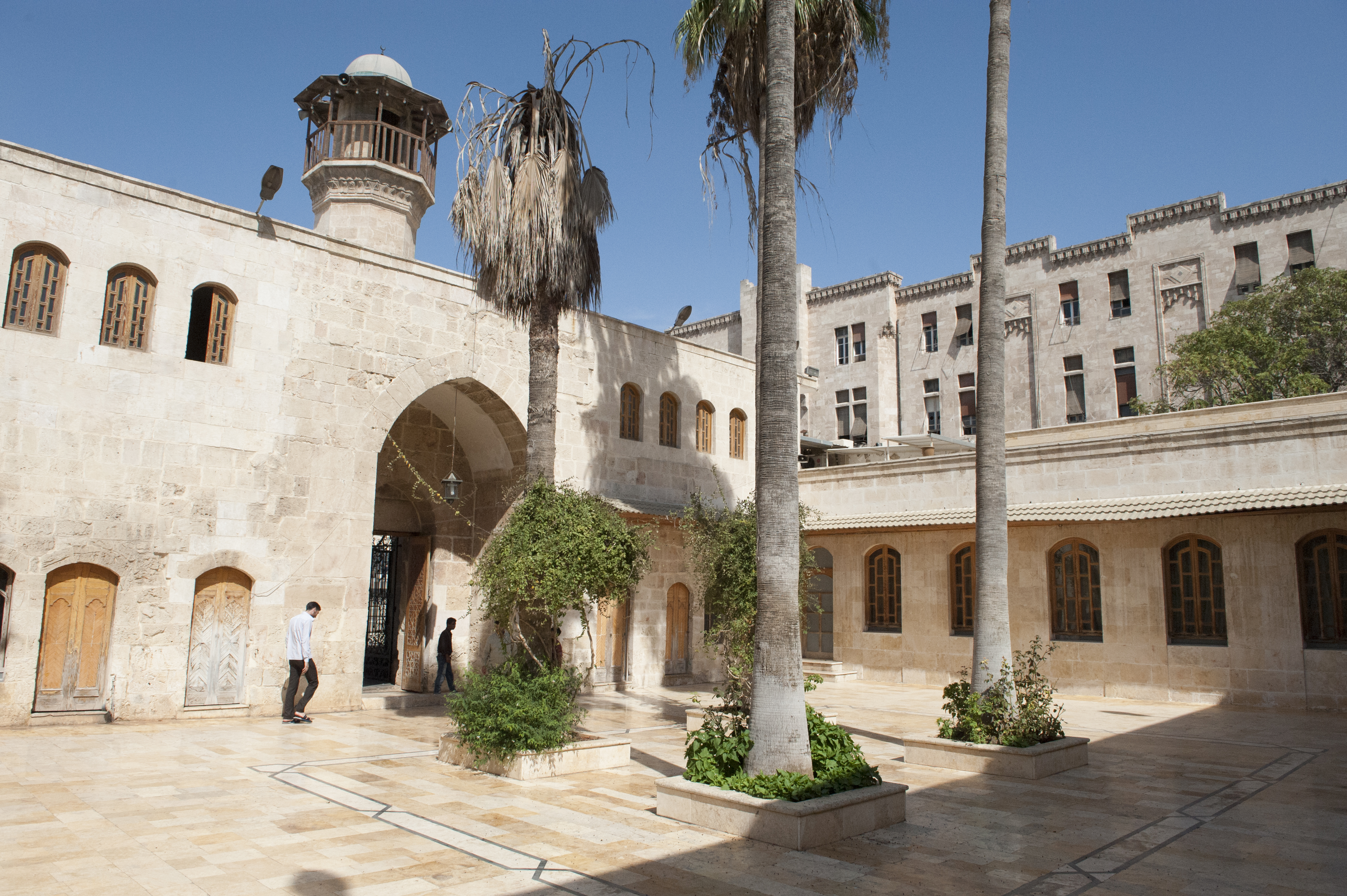
Courtyard of the madrasa

Mihrab and minbar

Mosque's mihrab

Detail of the mihrab

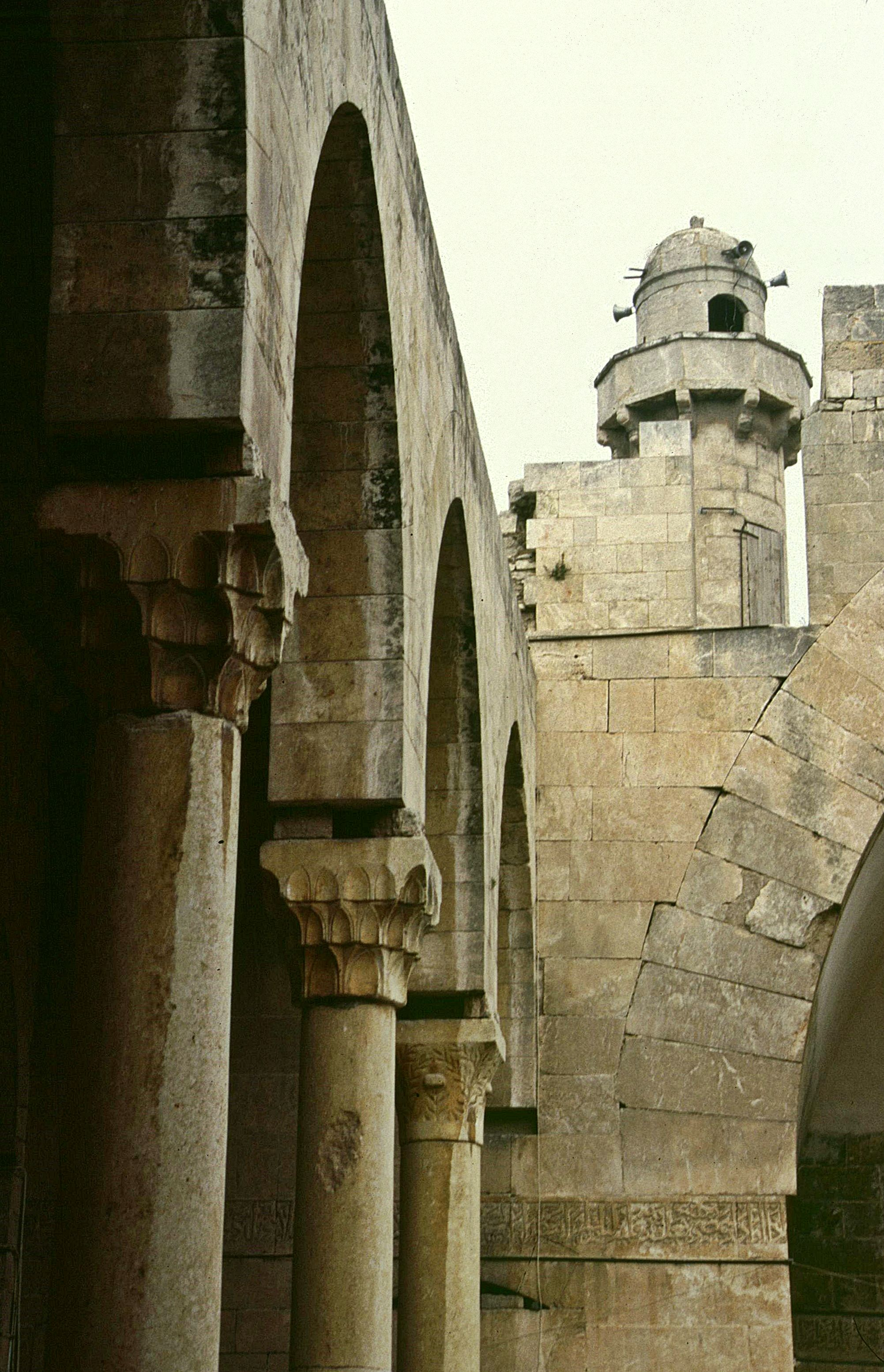
A riwaq (arcade) in the madrasa

Portal of the madrasa

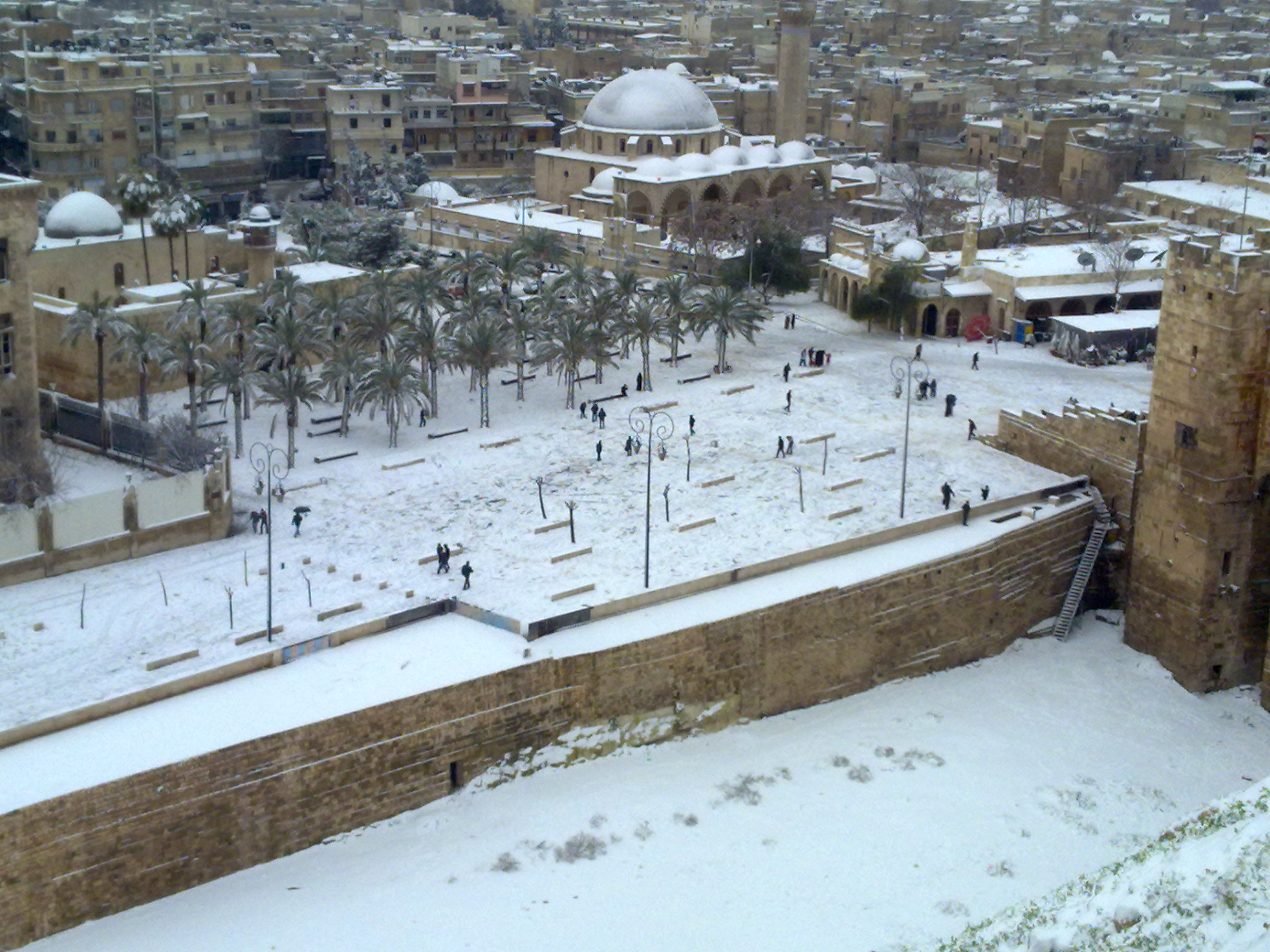
The madrasa from Citadel of Aleppo in the winter

== See also ==
- Late medieval domes
- List of mosques in Aleppo
- Education in Syria
- Islam in Syria

== Sources ==
- Tabbaa, Yasser (2021). Production of Meaning in Islamic Architecture and Ornament.
