= Ali ibn Ja'far ibn Fallah =

Quṭb al-Dawla Abū al-Ḥasan ʿAlī ibn Jaʾfar ibn Fallāh (Arabic: قطب الدولة علي بن جعفر بن فلاح) (fl. 1000 – 1021) was a Fatimid commander and governor in the service of Caliph al-Hakim (r. 996–1021).

== Life ==
Ali was a son of Ja'far ibn Falah, a prominent Kutami Berber general. Ali succeeded his brother Sulayman, a general who had served governor of Damascus in the late 10th century, as head of the family. After the death of Sulayman's successor as governor of Damascus, the Berber commander Jaysh ibn al-Samsama, in 1000, Ali became governor. Ali returned to Egypt around 1005 or before. There, he faced a nomadic Arab–Berber army led by the Umayyad leader Abu Rakwa. The latter defeated Ali at Giza and news of his defeat to Abu Rakwa's nomads caused panic in Cairo. Abu Rakwa skipped Cairo to raid the Fayyum oasis to the south, where he was defeated by a Fatimid army under al-Fadl ibn Salih.

Ali most likely is the person credited in an inscription found above the mosque of Salamiyah in central Syria for erecting a mausoleum for one of the Fatimids' "hidden" imams Abd Allah. Ali had captured Salamiyah for the Fatimids and likely built the mausoleum in 1009. It was later repaired by the local chief Khalaf ibn Mula'ib in 1088.

In July 1013 the Fatimid caliph al-Hakim bestowed the title Qutb al-Dawla (Axis of the State) on Ali and appointed him at the head of a 24,000-strong, Kutami army to rein in the Jarrahids, a Bedouin tribe which controlled Palestine. Ali entered Palestine's capital Ramla, and the sons of the Jarrahid chieftain Mufarrij ibn Daghfal, Ali and Mahmud, announced their loyalty to al-Hakim. Mufarrij, meanwhile, was poisoned and killed by his secretary on the order of al-Hakim, who afterward executed the secretary.

According to the historian Hugh N. Kennedy, Ali was al-Hakim's "most trusted commander ... the great political survivor of the reign," a period in which several high-ranking commanders and officials were executed by al-Hakim. Ali died shortly before al-Hakim, c. 1021, in a riding accident. Ali's son Safiyy al-Dawla Muhammad served as the Fatimid governor of Aleppo in 1022–1023.

== Bibliography ==
- Gil, Moshe (1997) [1983]. A History of Palestine, 634–1099. Translated by Ethel Broido. Cambridge: Cambridge University Press. ISBN 0-521-59984-9.
- Kennedy, Hugh (2004) [1986]. The Prophet and the Age of the Caliphates: The Islamic Near East from the 6th to the 11th Century (Second ed.). Harlow: Longman. ISBN 978-0-582-40525-7.
- Kramers, J. H. & Daftary, F. (1995). "Salamiyya". In Bosworth, C. E.; van Donzel, E.; Heinrichs, W. P. & Lecomte, G. (eds.). The Encyclopaedia of Islam, Second Edition. Volume VIII: Ned–Sam. Leiden: E. J. Brill. pp. 921–923. ISBN 978-90-04-09834-3.
- Sharon, Moshe (2007). Squeezes in the Max Van Berchem Collection (Palestine, Trans-Jordan, Northern Syria): Squeezes 1 - 84. Leiden and Boston: Brill. ISBN 978-90-04-15780-4.
- Zakkar, Suhayl (1971). The Emirate of Aleppo: 1004–1094. Aleppo: Dar al-Amanah.
