= Aziz al-Dawla =

Fatimid governor of Aleppo, c. 1016 to 1022

ʿAzīz al-Dawla Abu Shuja' Fātik al-Waḥīdī

Fatimid Governor of Aleppo
- In office October 1016 – 6 July 1022
- Appointed by: Al-Hakim
- Lieutenant: Abu'l-Najm Badr (governor of citadel)
- Preceded by: Fath al-Qal'i
- Succeeded by: Abu'l-Najm Badr

Aziz al-Dawla (Note: Full name: ʿAzīz al-Dawla Abū Shujāʿ Fātik al-Waḥīdī ibn ʿAbd Allāh al-Rūmī) (d. 1022) was the first Fatimid governor of Aleppo, serving from c. 1016 to his death. An ethnic Armenian, Aziz al-Dawla started his political career as a trusted ghulam (slave soldier) of Manjutakin, the Fatimid governor of Damascus under Caliph al-Hakim (r. 996–1021). The latter appointed Aziz al-Dawla governor of Aleppo, which prospered during his rule.

By 1020, Aziz al-Dawla was acting independently of al-Hakim, asserting his sovereignty by issuing his own coins and having his name pronounced in the khutba (Friday prayer sermon). When al-Hakim sent an army to suppress Aziz al-Dawla, the latter appealed for Byzantine support but canceled the appeal when al-Hakim mysteriously disappeared in early 1021. Afterward, the Fatimid court attempted to reconcile with Aziz al-Dawla, who nonetheless moved to secure his rule by building a well-fortified palace at the foot of the Aleppo citadel. In July 1022, Aziz al-Dawla was murdered in his sleep by one of his trusted ghulams in a plot devised by another of his ghulams, Abu'l-Najm Badr, with probable backing from al-Hakim's practical successor, Sitt al-Mulk. Badr succeeded Aziz al-Dawla as governor but was arrested three months later.

== Early career ==
Aziz al-Dawla was an ethnic Armenian and a ghulam of Manjutakin, the Fatimid governor of Damascus, during the reign of Caliph al-Hakim (r. 996–1021). The 12th-century historian Ibn al-Adim wrote that Manjutakin highly favored Aziz al-Dawla and described him as wise, courageous, and generous. Aziz al-Dawla was a Muslim, and the 15th-century historian al-Maqrizi described Aziz al-Dawla as "intelligent and pious".

== Governor of Aleppo ==
=== Appointment by al-Hakim ===
In 1016, the governor of Aleppo, Mansur ibn Lu'lu' fled the city amid a revolt led by his commander of the citadel, Fath al-Qal'i, with support from the local Banu Kilab led by Salih ibn Mirdas. The latter coveted control of Aleppo, while the Fatimids, who controlled the central and southern parts of Syria, saw an opportunity to extend their rule to the city and northern Syria. Fatimid troops from Afamiyah led by Ali ibn al-Dayf had been invited to help Fath maintain control of the city, but as the unrest continued, al-Dayf called for reinforcements. Afterward, al-Hakim dispatched troops from Sidon and Tripoli and compelled Fath to leave Aleppo and take up the governorship of Tyre; Fath had preferred ruling jointly with Salih, but the people of Aleppo rejected Bedouin rule and preferred a Fatimid administration.

In October 1016, al-Hakim appointed Aziz al-Dawla to replace Fath, making Aziz al-Dawla the first Fatimid-appointed governor of Aleppo and Jund Qinnasrin (district of northern Syria). Al-Hakim concurrently bestowed upon him a robe of honor, a sword and gold-plated saddle. Aziz al-Dawla entered Aleppo on 3 February 1017. Early in his rule, in 1018, Aziz al-Dawla persuaded Salih to have his mother, Rabab, reside in Aleppo. The move was meant to solidify his friendship with Salih and the Banu Kilab, and to demonstrate to Aleppo's inhabitants, who constantly lived in threat of a Byzantine invasion, that he was establishing a military alliance with the powerful Bedouin tribe against the Byzantines. Nothing else is known about the interactions between Aziz al-Dawla and Salih, but the historian Suhayl Zakkar, assumes Salih was satisfied with Aziz al-Dawla's rule.

=== Moves toward independence ===
Aziz al-Dawla was an ambitious governor and established Aleppo as an autonomous entity in between two regional rivals, the Fatimid Caliphate and the Byzantine Empire. Upon assuming the governorship, Aziz al-Dawla convinced Fatimid troops in the city that with their assignment being completed they should withdraw to their garrisons in Sidon, Tripoli and Afamiyah. He later dismissed Fatimid officials from the city and provincial posts. To publicly demonstrate his sovereignty, he issued his own coins omitting the name of al-Hakim and had his own name read in the city's mosques during the khutba (Friday prayer sermon). Moreover, he had his honorary name, al-Sayyid Amir al-Umara Aziz al-Dawla inscribed on the city's Antioch Gate and in silver chandeliers in the Great Mosque of Aleppo.

The date of Aziz al-Dawla's formal acts of sovereignty was not recorded by the contemporary sources, but Zakkar presumes they likely occurred in 1020. That year, al-Hakim launched an expedition to reassert direct Fatimid rule over Aleppo, prompting Aziz al-Dawla to request military assistance from the Byzantine emperor, Basil II (r. 976–1025). Al-Hakim mysteriously disappeared in February 1021 and when news of this reached Aziz al-Dawla, he canceled his deal with Basil II, whose army had reached the vicinity of Ayn Tab, and gained the backing of the Banu Kilab to counter the Byzantines. Basil II consequently withdrew.

The succession of al-Hakim's young son al-Zahir as caliph boosted Aziz al-Dawla's confidence, and the Fatimid court, which was effectively controlled by al-Hakim's sister, Sitt al-Mulk, sent him numerous gifts and robes of honor to reconcile with him. Nonetheless, Aziz al-Dawla sought to secure his virtual independence and built a well-fortified palace and bathhouse at the foot of the Aleppo's citadel. Furthermore, he recruited several ghulams into his service and bodyguard. The ghulams resided in the citadel and their commander was Abu'l-Najm Badr, a Turk who also served as governor of the citadel.

=== Assassination ===
Badr, with Sitt al-Mulk's secret encouragement, plotted to assassinate Aziz al-Dawla. The plot, according to medieval Muslim chroniclers, was initiated by Sitt al-Mulk and the Fatimid court. Zakkar speculates that the when Sitt al-Mulk dispatched envoys carrying gifts for Aziz al-Dawla, she also sent them with messages to Badr promising him Aziz al-Dawla's post should he betray his master. Badr manipulated another ghulam of Aziz al-Dawla, Tuzun, who was of Indian origin, to commit the murder by warning him that Aziz al-Dawla attempted to have Tuzun killed on several occasions, but these were all averted by Badr's intervention; Badr convinced Tuzun, whom Aziz al-Dawla had great affection for, that he should kill Aziz al-Dawla to save his own life.

On 6 July 1022, Aziz al-Dawla had gone hunting while Badr and Tuzun plotted his murder. Upon his return to the palace, Aziz al-Dawla bathed, ate, had become drunk, then went to bed. While Aziz al-Dawla was sleeping, Tuzun decapitated him with his sword. Badr witnessed the slaying and then immediately turned on Tuzun and alerted the other ghulams, who responded by killing Tuzun. Zakkar explains that the aforementioned story is the only narrative describing Aziz al-Dawla's murder and "it is difficult to accept it at face value". He also finds Sitt al-Mulk's alleged participation in the plot to be "questionable".

In any case, Badr reported Aziz al-Dawla's murder to the Fatimid court, which publicly mourned Aziz al-Dawla, but was secretly satisfied with his death. Badr was appointed as Aziz al-Dawla's successor, but he governed for a little over three months before Ali al-Dayf was sent to arrest him. He was thereafter replaced by separate governors for the city and citadel of Aleppo. By 1025, Salih and the Banu Kilab evicted the Fatimid governors and established Mirdasid rule over the city.

== Culture ==
Aziz al-Dawla was a cultured ruler with a particular love for poetry, literature, and philosophy. He wrote poetry himself. The prominent local poet al-Ma'arri had friendly relations with Aziz al-Dawla and dedicated two of his works to him: Risalat al-Sahil wa'l Shahij ("Letter of a Horse and a Mule") and Kitab al-Qa'if.

== Bibliography ==
- Dadoyan, Seta B. (1997). The Fatimid Armenians: Cultural and Political Interaction in the Near East. E.J. Brill. ISBN 90-04-10816-5.
- Dadoyan, Seta B. (2013). The Armenians in the Medieval Islamic World: Armenian Realpolitik in the Islamic World and Diverging Paradigms: Case of Cilicia Eleventh to Fourteenth Centuries. Transaction Publishers. ISBN 978-1-4128-4577-9.
- Zakkar, Suhayl (1971). The Emirate of Aleppo: 1004–1094. Aleppo: Dar al-Amanah.

Preceded by Fath al-Qal'i	Emir of Aleppo; October 1016–January 1022	Succeeded by Abu'l-Najm Badr
