= Maleinos =

Maleinos Μαλεΐνος
- Noble family
- Country: Byzantine Empire
- Place of origin: Cappadocia
- Founded: 9th century
- Founder: Nikephoros Maleinos (first known)
- Final head: Stephen Maleinos (last known)
- Titles: Patrikios; Strategos; Magistros; Proedros
- Dissolution: 12th century

The Maleinos (pl. Maleinoi; Greek: Μαλεΐνος, pl. Μαλεΐνοι) was a Byzantine Greek noble family, first attested in the 9th century. The family rose to be amongst the most important and powerful members of the Anatolian aristocracy (the dynatoi) in the 10th century, providing many senior generals to the Byzantine army. After its wealth and power became the target of Byzantine emperor Basil II (r. 976–1025), it declined, although its members are still attested in Anatolia and the Balkans throughout the 11th and 12th centuries.

== History and members ==
The family, of Greek origin, first appears in the second half of the 9th century. It has been suggested that the surname derives from the location of Malagina in Bithynia, however its main estates and power-base were in the theme of Charsianon in Cappadocia, which must be considered their proper homeland.

The first known member of the family was the general Nikephoros Maleinos, of whom it is only known that in 866 he suppressed the revolt of logothetes tou dromou Symbatios, a relative of the recently murdered Caesar Bardas. The patrikios and general Eustathios Maleinos, attested later in the century, was probably a brother or son of Nikephoros. Eustathios's son, Eudokimos, married the daughter of patrikios Adralestos, who was related by marriage to the Emperor Romanos I Lekapenos (r. 920–944).

Eudokimos had seven children, the most prominent among them were Constantine and Michael Maleinos. Constantine was a general and long-time governor (strategos) of the theme of Cappadocia in the middle of the 10th century. From his post, Constantine participated in several campaigns against the Arabs. Michael became a monk at a young age and achieved great fame. He was the mentor of Athanasius the Athonite and was a spiritual advisor to his nephews, the brothers Nikephoros Phokas (the future emperor Nikephoros II, r. 963–969) and Leo Phokas, born to an unnamed sister, the wife of the general Bardas Phokas the Elder. Leo Maleinos, presumably a son of either Nikephoros or Constantine Maleinos, participated in battles against the Arabs in Syria and was killed in 953.

Thanks to these connections with the rising power of the Phokas clan, by the 950s the Maleinoi had established themselves as one of the leading Anatolian families, and amassed immense wealth. According to Arab sources, one of their estates stretched continuously from Claudiopolis in Bithynia to the Sangarios river, covering some 115 square kilometers. The leading representative of the family in the latter 10th century was Constantine's son, the magistros Eustathios Maleinos. A leading general under John I Tzimiskes (r. 969–976) and during the early years of Emperor Basil II's reign, he participated in the aristocratic rebellion of 987 led by Bardas Phokas the Younger. After Phokas's death in 989, Maleinos was not severely punished but confined to his estates. After a few years, Emperor Basil II had him removed to Constantinople and confiscated his wealth after Eustathios's death.

The Maleinoi never recovered their former power after this blow. Family members are still attested in lead seals of officials (with relatively high titles such as patrikios and proedros) and mentioned in literary or legal sources from the 11th and 12th centuries, which also document the settlement of a branch of the family in Macedonia, most probably due to the conquest of Cappadocia by the Seljuk Turks. The nature and sparsity of these references demonstrate the effective loss of any political power by the clan: a Stephen Maleinos was a landowner near Thessalonica in 1084, and another Maleinos, who rebelled against Emperor Andronikos I Komnenos (r. 1183–1185) in 1185, is described by Niketas Choniates as neither of noble birth nor rich. The family is not attested thereafter.

A Maleinos family is also attested in southern Italy and particularly Calabria from the second half of the 10th century and up to the 12th century, who served as soldiers, administrators or church members. Their connection, if any, with the Anatolian Maleinos clan, is unknown.

== Sources ==
- Cheynet, Jean-Claude (1996). Pouvoir et Contestations à Byzance (963–1210) (in French). Paris: Publications de la Sorbonne. ISBN 978-2-85944-168-5.
- Holmes, Catherine (2005). Basil II and the Governance of Empire (976–1025). Oxford: Oxford University Press. ISBN 978-0-19-927968-5.
- Kazhdan, Alexander; Cutler, Antony (1991). "Maleinos". In Kazhdan, Alexander (ed.). The Oxford Dictionary of Byzantium. Oxford and New York: Oxford University Press. p. 1276. ISBN 0-19-504652-8.
- Krsmanović, Bojana (September 11, 2003). "Maleinos Family". Encyclopaedia of the Hellenic World: Asia Minor. Athens: Foundation of the Hellenic World. Archived from the original on 27 February 2012.
- Lilie, Ralph-Johannes; Ludwig, Claudia; Pratsch, Thomas; Zielke, Beate (2013). Prosopographie der mittelbyzantinischen Zeit Online. Berlin-Brandenburgische Akademie der Wissenschaften. Nach Vorarbeiten F. Winkelmanns erstellt (in German). Berlin and Boston: De Gruyter.
- Loparev, Chr. (1897). "Описание некоторых греческих Житий святых" [Description of some Greek Lives of the Saints]. Византийский временник (in Russian). 4: 358–363.
- Loparev, Chr. (1908). "Житие св. Евдокима" [Life of St. Eudokimos]. Известия Русского Археологического Института в Константинополе (in Russian). 13: 152–252.
