= Michael Maleinos =

10th-century Byzantine Orthodox monk and saint

Saint Michael Maleinos
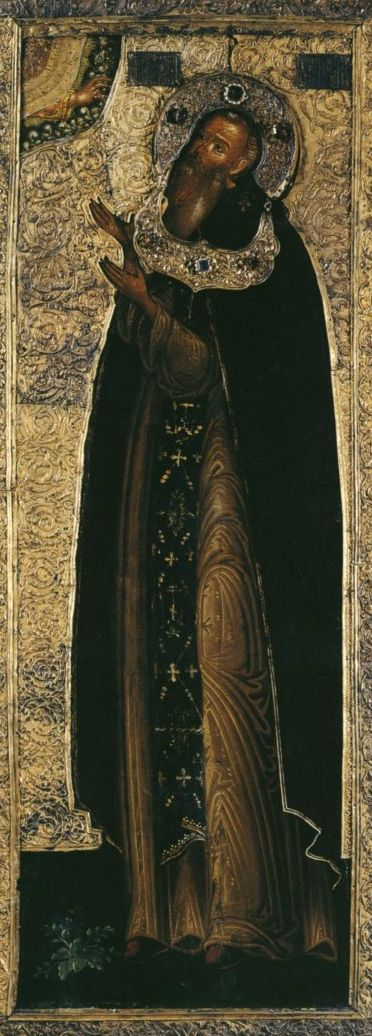
- Michael Maleinos (icon, 1630s)
- Born: Manuel Maleinos c. 894; Cappadocia (modern-day Turkey)
- Residence: Mount Kyminas (modern-day Bursa, Turkey)
- Died: 12 July 961; Mount Kyminas (modern-day Bursa, Turkey)
- Venerated in: Eastern Orthodox Church
- Feast: July 12
- Tradition or genre: Byzantine monasticism

Saint Michael Maleinos (Greek: Μιχαήλ Μαλεΐνος, c. 894–12 July 961) was a Byzantine monk who commanded great respect among Christians of Asia Minor. He was the brother of general Constantine Maleinos and uncle of Nikephoros Phokas, who was greatly influenced by Michael and became Byzantine emperor several years after Michael's death. His feast day is July 12.

== Life ==
He was born Manuel Maleinos (Μανουήλ Μαλεΐνος) about 894, into a wealthy land-owning family of Cappadocia. Both of his grandfathers had been high military officers and had risen to the rank of patrikios. His father Eudokimos was likewise a patrikios, while his mother Anastaso was a relative of the emperor Romanos I Lekapenos. He had at least one brother, Constantine Maleinos, and one sister whose name is not known. She married the general Bardas Phokas the Elder, thus linking the Maleinoi with the powerful military family of the Phokades.

He spent his youth at the court of Emperor Leo the Wise, who was his relative. At the age of 18 he denounced worldly pleasures and withdrew to Bithynia, where he founded a highly reputable lavra under the guidance of elder John Heladites, and took the name Michael.

After a time Michael was ordained to the priesthood. He was said to have been compassionate and kindly towards people.

The elder John, gave Michael permission to live a solitary life in a cave. Five days of the week he spent at prayerful concentration, and only on Saturday and Sunday did he come to the monastery for participation in Divine services and communion.

His example attracted others, and in a desolate place called Dry Lake, the Monk Michael founded a monastery and gave it a strict ustav (monastic rule). When the monastery was secure, the Monk Michael went to a still more remote place and built there a new monastery. Over time, by the efforts of the holy abba, Kumineia Mountain was covered with monastic communities.

Maleinos had great influence on his nephew, the general and later emperor Nikephoros II Phokas (r. 963–969), as well as on Athanasius the Athonite.

Athanasius, who started his monastic life at Michael's monastery about the year 953, later modeled the Great Lavra, Mount Athos upon Michael's establishment.

Michael Maleinos died at Mount Kyminas on 12 July 961.

== Veneration ==
Michael Maleinos was a patron saint of Mikhail Feodorovich, the first Romanov tsar. Owing to this fact, he was greatly revered by the Romanov dynasty and many chapels were dedicated to him in Russia in the first half of the 17th century.

== Sources ==
- Kazhdan, Alexander, ed. (1991). The Oxford Dictionary of Byzantium. Oxford and New York: Oxford University Press. ISBN 0-19-504652-8.
- Laiou, Angeliki E. (1998). "The General and the Saint: Michael Maleinos and Nikephoros Phokas". ΕΥΨΥΧΙΑ. Mélanges offerts à Hélène Ahrweiler. Paris: Éditions de la Sorbonne. pp. 399–412. ISBN 9782859448301.
- Lilie, Ralph-Johannes; Ludwig, Claudia; Pratsch, Thomas; Zielke, Beate (2013). Prosopographie der mittelbyzantinischen Zeit Online. Berlin-Brandenburgische Akademie der Wissenschaften. Nach Vorarbeiten F. Winkelmanns erstellt (in German). Berlin and Boston: De Gruyter.
