= December 10 (Eastern Orthodox liturgics) =

Day in the Eastern Orthodox liturgical calendar

Eastern Orthodox liturgical calendar
December 9	December 10	December 11
December 10 O.S. ≍ December 23 N.S. December 10 N.S ≍ November 27 O.S.

An Eastern Orthodox cross

December 10 in Eastern Orthodox liturgical calendars is a feast day and a day of commemoration of saints and martyrs. Although some Orthodox churches use the Revised Julian Calendar and others use the traditional Julian calendar, the fixed commemorations for their respective December 10 are broadly the same, no matter which calendar is used. (Note: Despite the dates being the same, the days to which they refer typically differ by 13 days. The notation Old Style or O.S. is sometimes used to indicate a date in the traditional Julian Calendar (the "Old Calendar"). The notation New Style or N.S. indicates a date in the Revised Julian calendar (the "New Calendar").)

== Saints ==
- Martyrs Menas the Melodius (Most Eloquent), Hermogenes, and Eugraphus, of Alexandria (c. 313) (Note: The Holy Martyrs Minos, Hermogenes and Eugraphos suffered for their faith in Christ under the emperor Maximian (305-313). Saint Minos was sent by the emperor from Athens to Alexandria to suppress the riots that had arisen between the Christians and the pagans. Distinguished for his gift of eloquence, Minos instead openly began to preach the Christian faith and he converted many pagans to Christ. Learning of this, Maximian dispatched Hermogenes to the Alexandria district to conduct a trial over the saints, and moreover was given orders to purge the city of Christians. Hermogenes, although he was a pagan, was distinguished however by his reverent bearing. And struck by the endurance of Saint Minos under torture and by his miraculous healing after the cruel torments, he also came to believe in Christ. Maximian himself then arrived in Alexandria. Neither the astonishing stoic endurance under torture of Saints Minos and Hermogenes, nor even the miracles of these days manifest of God in this city, in any way mollified the emperor, but instead vexed him all the more. The emperor personally stabbed Saint Eugraphos, the secretary of Saint Minos, and then gave orders to behead the holy Martyrs Minos and Hermogenes. The remains of the holy martyrs, cast into the sea in an iron chest, were afterwards found (about this see under 17 February) and transferred to Constantinople. The emperor Justinian built a church in the name of the holy Martyr Minos of Alexandria. Saint Joseph the Melodist (Comm. 4 April) composed a canon in honour of the holy martyrs.)
- Martyr Gemellus of Paphlagonia, cruelly tortured and crucified at Ancyra (361) (Note: "At Ancyra, in Galatia, St. Gemellus, martyr, who, after severe torments, consummated his martyrdom by being crucified, under Julian the Apostate.")
- Hieromartyr Theoteknos (Theotecnus), by the sword (Note: See also: (in Greek) Θεότεκνος. Βικιπαίδεια. (Greek Wikipedia).) (Note: He may be the same saint commemorated on October 10, although the Greek sources state he was martyred by the sword, while the Slavic sources affirm he was drowned.)
- Martyr Marianus, by stoning
- Martyr Eugenios, beaten to death
- Saint Athanasios, Bishop of Methoni, Messenia (c. 880)
- Venerable Thomas Dephourkinos the Righteous of Mount Kyminas in Bithynia (10th century) (Note: Born at an unknown date at the foot of Mt. Kyminaion (= Mt. Kyminas in Bithynia) to middle-class (autarkeis) parents, Thomas had a religious education, studying the Psalter, the apostolic epistles, and other ecclesiastic writings. He became a monk, and was then appointed hegoumenos of a monastery newly founded by the magnate Galolektes on the Sangarios River. After some years he retired to a hermitage, which soon became a monastery. For years he was sorely afflicted by demonic attacks in the form of mosquitoes, flies, wasps and snakes, from which he was finally delivered after prayer to God. Thomas was famed for his gift of healing and clairvoyance, as shown when he was able to reply to a pittakion sent by Leo VI (886-912) without opening and reading it. The allusion to Leo is the only chronological indication in his late synaxarion notice, found in a 15th-century manuscript. Grégoire suggests that Thomas is to be identified with the palace priest who blessed the marriage of Leo VI and Zoe in 906.)

== Pre-Schism Western saints ==
- Saints Carpophorus and Abundius, a priest and his deacon who suffered under Diocletian (c. 290-300) (Note: "The same day, Saints Carpophorus, priest, and Abundius, deacon, who became martyrs in the persecution of Diocletian. They were first most cruelly beaten with rods, then imprisoned and denied food and drink; being racked a second time and again thrown into prison, they were finally beheaded.")
- Virgin Martyr Eulalia of Barcelona, the most famous virgin martyr in Spain, burnt at the stake under Diocletian (304) (Note: Prudentius wrote a long hymn describing her martyrdom and she is mentioned by other writers. Born in Mérida, aged thirteen she was burnt at the stake there under Diocletian.) (Note: "At Merida, in Spain, in the time of Maximian, the martyrdom of the holy virgin Eulalia, who, at twelve years of age, suffered many torments for the confession of Christ, by order of the governor Dacian. Finally she was stretched on the rack, torn with iron hooks, had her sides burned with flaming torches, and fire being forced down her throat, she expired.")
- Saint Julia of Mérida, a martyr together with Saint Eulalia, in Mérida in Spain under Diocletian (304) (Note: "Again, in the same city, St. Julia, virgin and martyr, the companion of blessed Eulalia, who would not be separated from her when the latter went to suffer.")
- Saint Mercurius and Companions, at Lentini in Sicily, soldiers who were beheaded under the governor Tertyllus, in the time of Emperor Licinius (c. 308) (Note: A group of soldiers told to escort Christian prisoners to their place of execution in Lentini in Sicily. The soldiers were so impressed by the prisoners that they too declared themselves believers in Christ and all of them were beheaded together.)
- Saint Miltiades, Pope of Rome from 311 to 314, who condemned Donatism and was venerated as a martyr on account of his many sufferings during the persecution of Maximian (314) (Note: "AT Rome, pope St. Melchiades, who, having suffered much in the persecution of Maximian, rested in the Lord when peace was given to the Church.")
- Saint Deusdedit, Bishop of Brescia in Italy, played a leading part in the Councils against monothelitism (c. 700)
- Saint Gregory III, Pope of Rome, who was much troubled by iconoclasm and the raids of the Lombards (741)
- Saint Sindulf of Vienne (Sindulphus), the thirty-first Bishop of Vienne in France (c. 669)
- Saint Guitmarus, fourth Abbot of Saint-Riquier in France (765)
- Saint Hildemar (Hildemanus), a monk at Corbie who became Bishop of Beauvais in France in 821 (844)

== Post-Schism Orthodox saints ==
- Righteous Jovan (John) Branković, King of Serbia (1502-1503), and his parents Righteous Stefan (Stephen) Branković the Blind, Despot of Serbia (1446, 1468, or 1476), and Venerable Angelina Branković of Serbia (1520)
- Saint Joasaph (Ioasaph) Gorlenko, Bishop of Belgorod (1754) (see also September 4)

=== New martyrs and confessors ===
- New Hieromartyr Alexander Shklaev of Perm, Protopresbyter (1918)
- New Hieromartyr Jacob Shestakov of Perm, Priest (1918)
- New Hieromartyr Eugraphus Pletnev of Perm, Priest, and his son, Mikhail Pletnev (1918)
- New Hieromartyrs of Ryazan: Protopresbyters - Anatolius Pravdoliubov, (Note: See: (in Russian) Правдолюбов, Анатолий Авдеевич. Википедии. (Russian Wikipedia).) Alexander Tuberovsky, (Note: See: (in Russian) Туберовский, Александр Михайлович. Википедии. (Russian Wikipedia).) Eugene Kharkov, and Constantine Bazhanov (1937), and with them:
  - New Hieromartyr Nicholas Karasiov, Priest
  - New Martyrs Peter Grishin, Michael Yakunkin, Eusebius Tryakhov, Dorotheus Klimashev, Laurentius Kogtyev, Gregory Berdenev
  - New Virgin Martyrs Alexandra Ustiukhina and Tatiana Yegorova (Note: See: (in Russian) Егорова, Татьяна Прокопьевна. Википедии. (Russian Wikipedia).)
  - New Hieromartyr Michael Kobozev, Priest (Note: See: (in Russian) Михаил Благиевский. Википедии. (Russian Wikipedia).)
  - New Hieromartyr Sergius Sorokin, Hieromonk of Sreznevo, Ryazan (1937)
- New Virgin Martyr Eudocia (after 1937)
- New Hieromartyr Protopresbyter Nicholas Rozov of Yaroslavl-Rostov (1938)
- New Hieromartyr Alexis Vvedensky, Priest (1938)
- New Virgin Confessors Anna Ivashkina and Tatiana Byakirevoy (1948)
- New Virgin Confessor Thecla Makusheva (1954)
- Venerable New Nun-Confessor Anna Stoliarova, Schemanun of Sreznevo, Ryazan (1958)

== Other commemorations ==
- Synaxis of the Archangel Michael at the Adda River in northern Italy, before the Battle of Coronate (689)

== Icon gallery ==
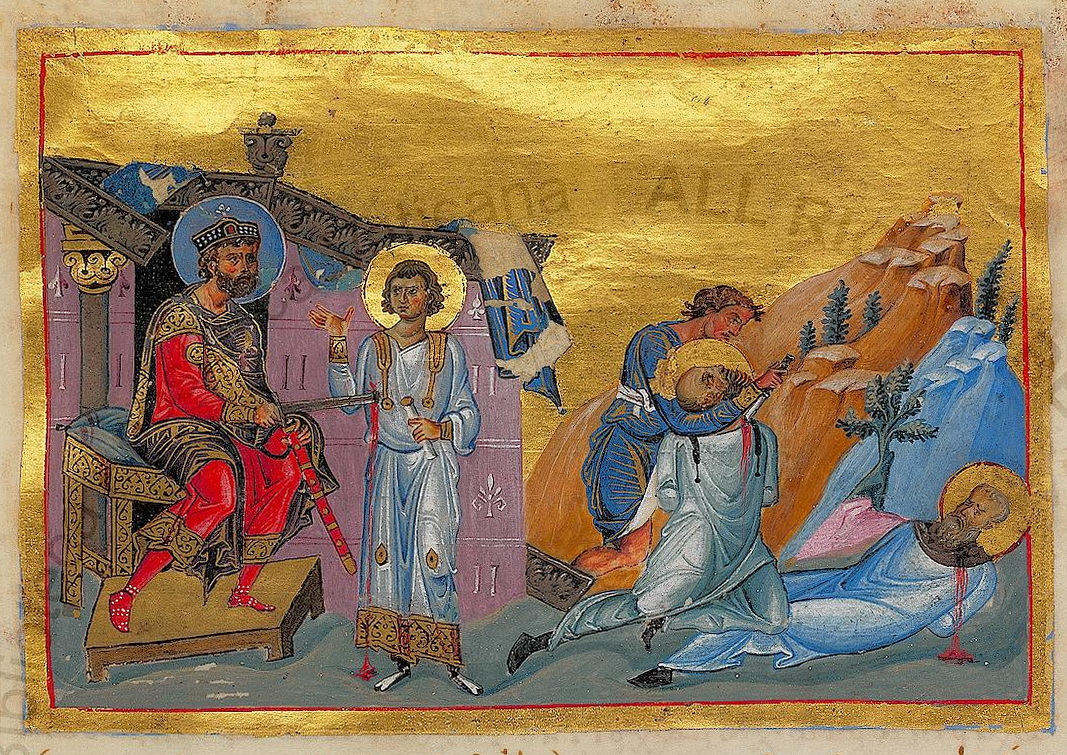
Martyrs Menas the Melodius (Most Eloquent), Hermogenes, and Eugraphus, of Alexandria.
(Menologion of Basil II, 10th century).

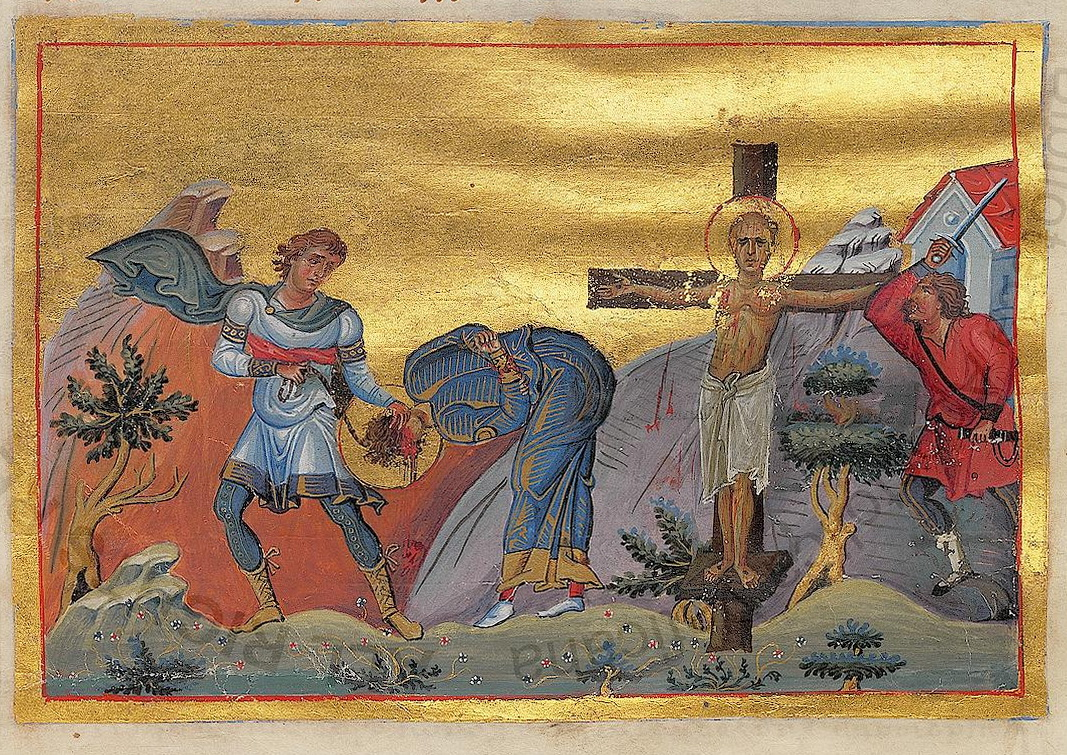
Martyrdom of St. Gemellus of Paphlagonia.
(Menologion of Basil II, 10th century).

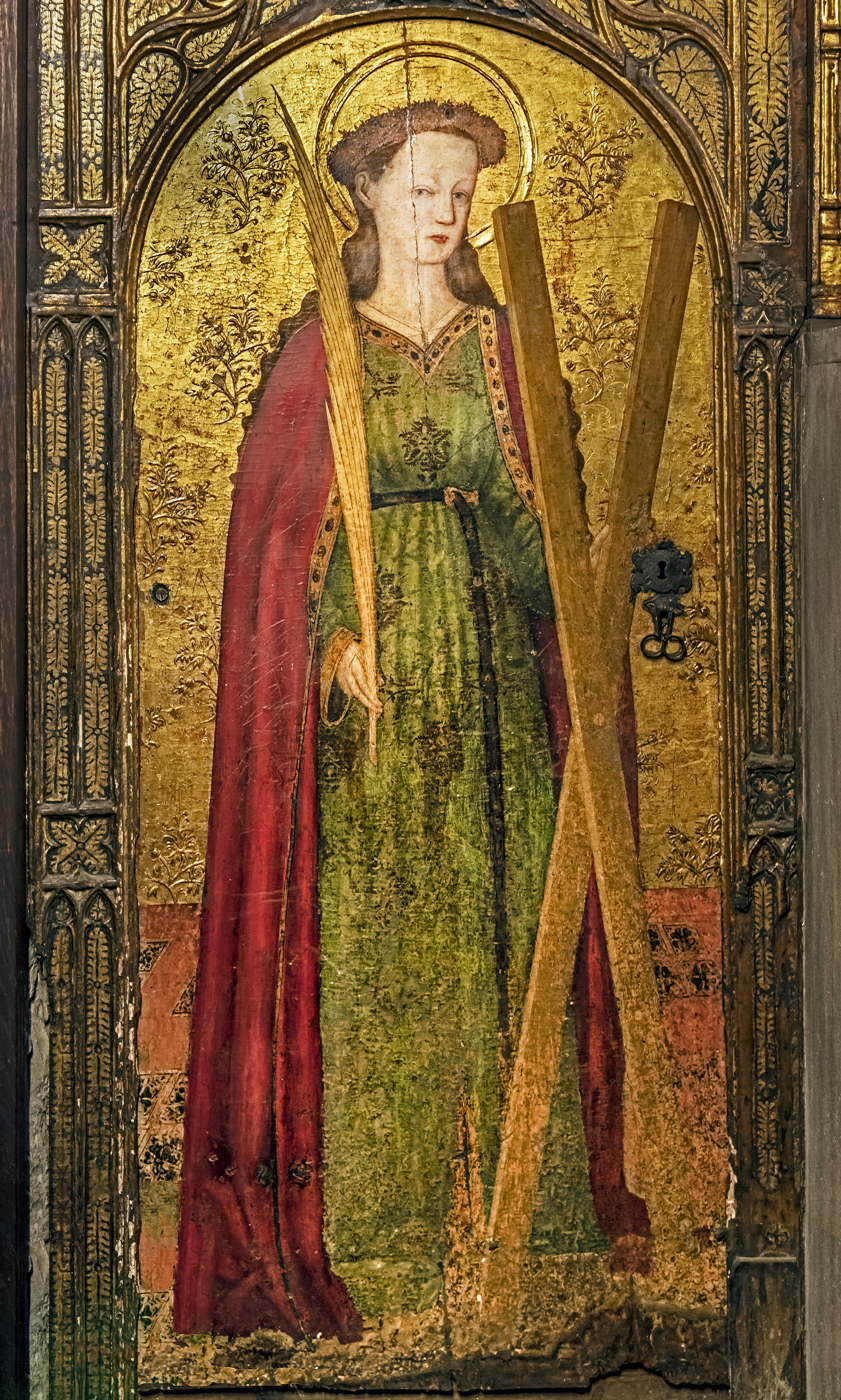
Virgin Martyr Eulalia of Barcelona, the most famous virgin martyr in Spain, burnt at the stake.
(Barcelona Cathedral).

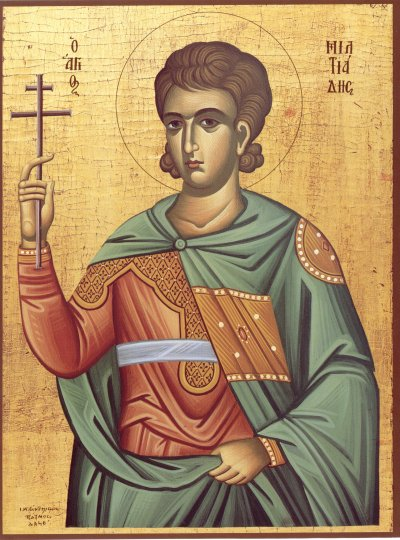
Icon of Pope Miltiades.

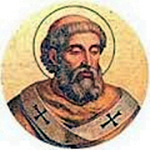
St. Gregory III, Pope of Rome.

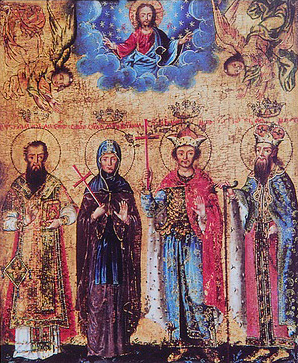
Saints Maksim, Angelina, Jovan and Stefan (Stephen) Branković
(c. 1645, by Andreja Raičević).

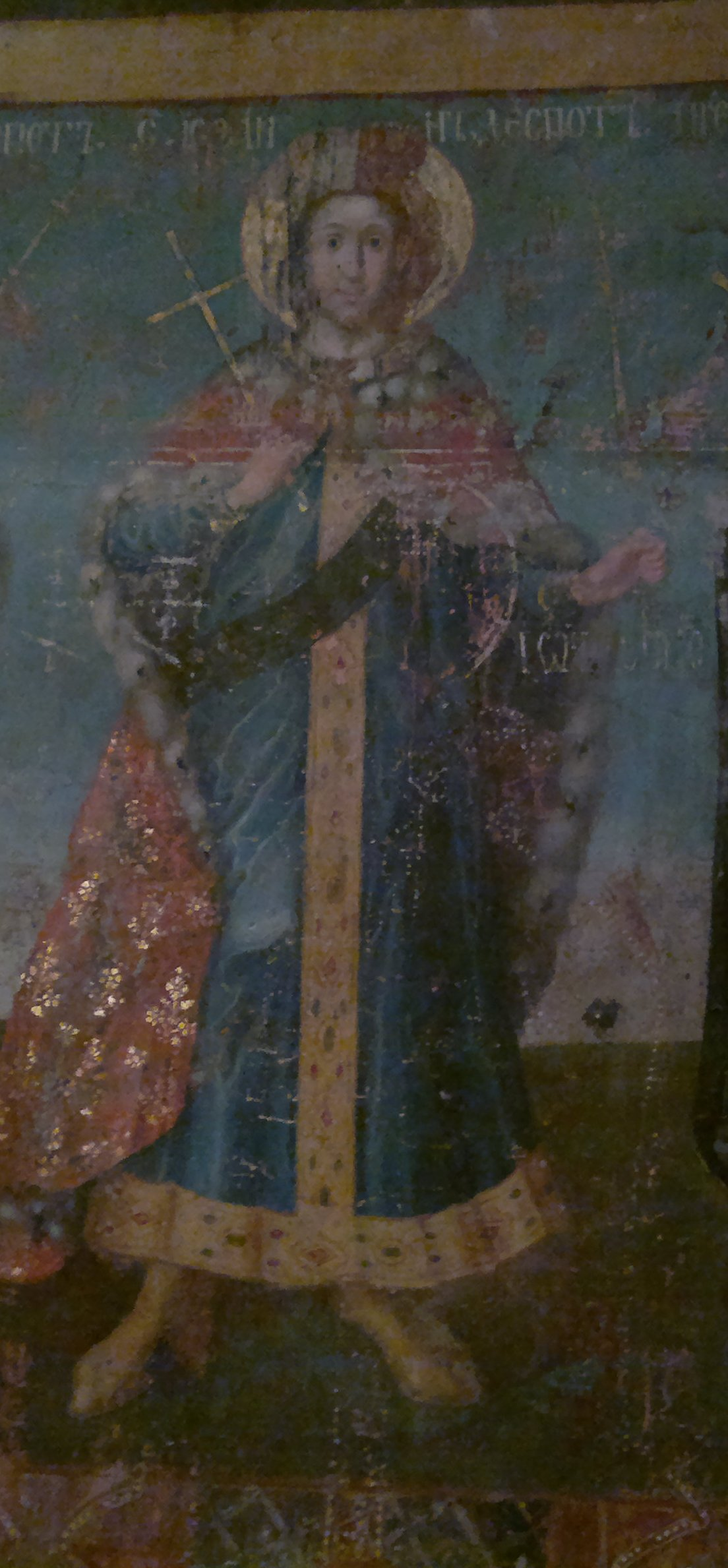
Fresco of Blessed Jovan Branković in Krušedol Monastery.

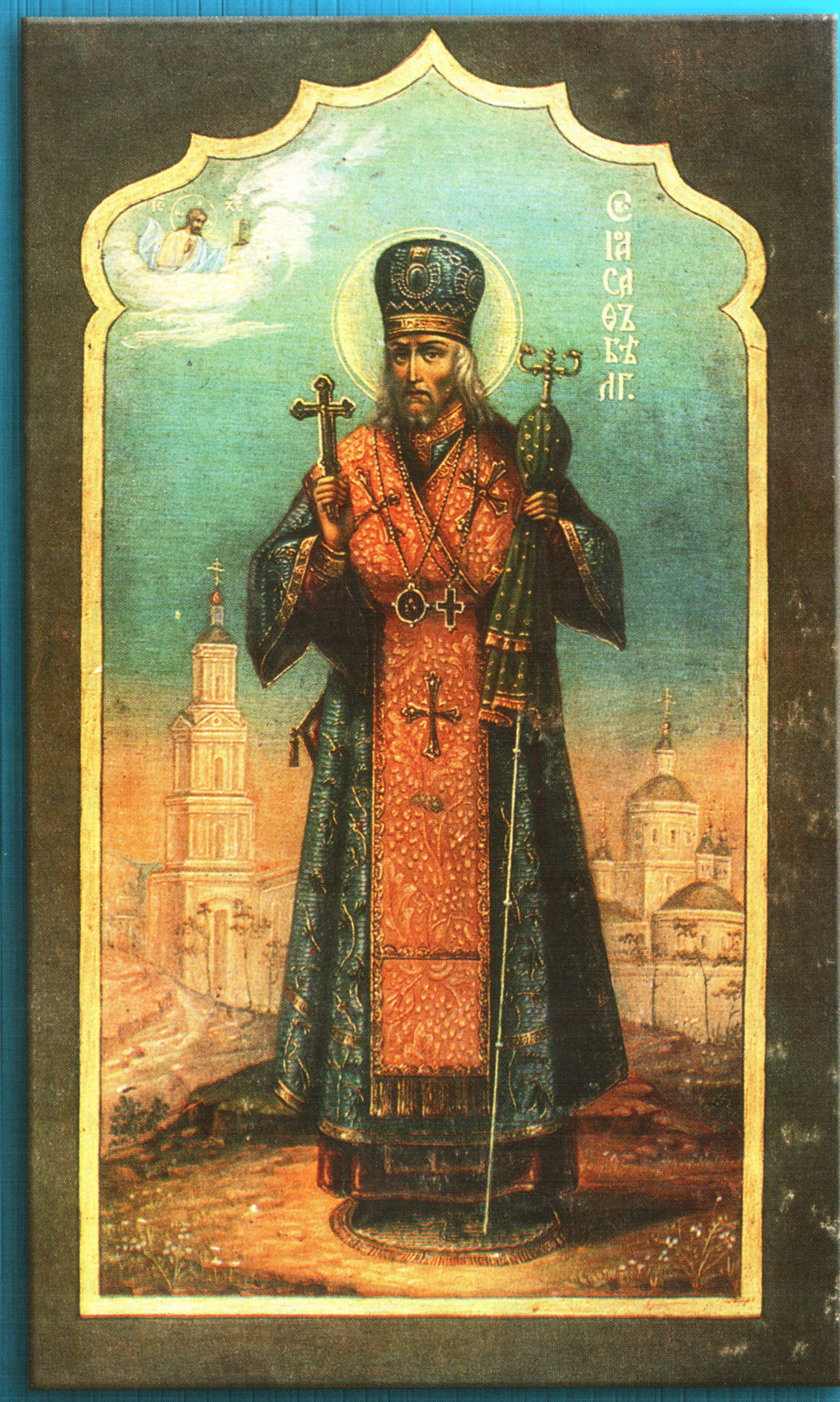
Saint Ioasaph of Belgorod.

New Hieromartyr Protopresbyter Anatolius Pravdoliubov (sitting, far right), with clergy from Kasimov.

New Hieromartyr Protopresbyter Alexander Tuberovsky.

== Sources ==
- December 10/23. Orthodox Calendar (PRAVOSLAVIE.RU).
- December 23 / December 10. HOLY TRINITY RUSSIAN ORTHODOX CHURCH (A parish of the Patriarchate of Moscow).
- December 10. OCA - The Lives of the Saints.
- The Autonomous Orthodox Metropolia of Western Europe and the Americas (ROCOR). St. Hilarion Calendar of Saints for the year of our Lord 2004. St. Hilarion Press (Austin, TX). p. 92.
- December 10. Latin Saints of the Orthodox Patriarchate of Rome.
- The Roman Martyrology. Transl. by the Archbishop of Baltimore. Last Edition, According to the Copy Printed at Rome in 1914. Revised Edition, with the Imprimatur of His Eminence Cardinal Gibbons. Baltimore: John Murphy Company, 1916. pp. 379–380.

Greek Sources

- Great Synaxaristes: (in Greek) 10 ΔΕΚΕΜΒΡΙΟΥ. ΜΕΓΑΣ ΣΥΝΑΞΑΡΙΣΤΗΣ.
- (in Greek) Συναξαριστής. 10 Δεκεμβρίου. ECCLESIA.GR. (H ΕΚΚΛΗΣΙΑ ΤΗΣ ΕΛΛΑΔΟΣ).

Russian Sources

- (in Russian) 23 декабря (10 декабря). Православная Энциклопедия под редакцией Патриарха Московского и всея Руси Кирилла (электронная версия). (Orthodox Encyclopedia - Pravenc.ru).
- (in Russian) 10 декабря (ст.ст.) 23 декабря 2014 (нов. ст.). Русская Православная Церковь Отдел внешних церковных связей. (DECR).
