= Balabolu =

Ancient settlement in Turkey

- Adrasus
- Location within Turkey
- 36°38′56″N 33°06′30″E
- Type: Settlement
- Location: Mut, Mersin Province, Turkey
- Region: Cilicia Trachea

Site notes
- Condition: In ruins

Balabolu is a hill and an archaeological site on the hill in Mersin Province, Turkey.

It is in the rural area of Mut ilçe at 36°38′56″N 33°06′30″E. Its distance to Yalnızcabağ village is about 5 kilometres (3.1 mi), to Mut is 45 kilometres (28 mi) and to Mersin is 205 kilometres (127 mi). Visitors follow Mut-Ermenek highway and turn north to reach the site. The original name of the site was Adrasus (or Andrassos). Adrasus was a Roman and Byzantine town. The Battle of Andrassos in which Byzantines defeated Hamdanid army in 960 was around Adrasus. In the 13th century the town fell to Nure Sofi of Karamanids.

== The ruins ==
The buildings are mostly demolished. But it appears that a there was a church on top of the hill. The rock carved rooms are in the slopes. There is a cistern and a canal. The necropolis is around the hill. There are figures of animals (like lion) in some sarcophagi.
