= Athanasius the Athonite =

Byzantine monk (c. 920 – c. 1003)

Saint Athanasios of Athos
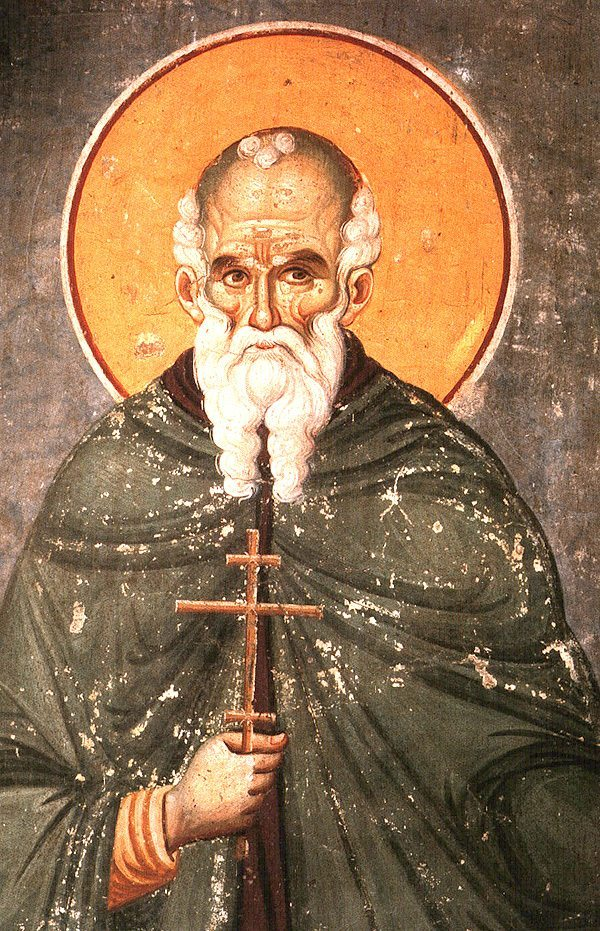
- Fresco of St. Athanasios the Athonite in Protaton, Athos, Greece

Confessor
- Born: c. 920; Trebizond, Byzantine Empire (modern-day Trabzon, Turkey)
- Died: c. 1003; Mount Athos, Greece
- Venerated in: Eastern Orthodox Church; Catholic Church
- Major shrine: Great Lavra Monastery, Mount Athos
- Feast: 5 July

Athanasius the Athonite (Greek: Ἀθανάσιος ὁ Ἀθωνίτης; c. 920 – c. 1003), was a Byzantine monk who is considered the founder of the monastic community on the peninsula of Mount Athos, which has since evolved into the greatest centre of Eastern Orthodox monasticism.

== Biography ==
His parents were from Antioch. He was born in Trebizond and patronized by Michael Maleinos. He studied at Constantinople and became famous there as "Abraham", a fervent preacher who held great authority with Michael Maleinos's nephew, Nicephoros Phocas. By the time Phocas ascended the imperial throne, "Abraham", ill at ease with the lax morals of the monks living in the capital, changed his name to Athanasios and joined the monks at Mount Kyminas in Bithynia, in Minor Asia. In 958, he relocated to Mount Athos.

He helped defend the hermits, or sketes, there against the Saracens, and also started to incorporate the sketes already there into what would eventually become known as the Great Lavra, which Athanasios built with the financial assistance of Nicephoros. This monastery was dedicated in 963. It is still in use today, and is often referred to by people of the area simply as "Lavra", or "The Monastery". Three other foundations followed shortly thereafter, with all three of them remaining in place to the present. Athanasios met with considerable opposition from the hermits already at Mount Athos in the construction of his monasteries, who resented his intrusion and his attempts to bring order and discipline to their lives.

Upon Nicephoros' death, the enemies of Athanasios prevailed and he had to leave Athos for Cyprus, where he lived until the new emperor, John Tzimisces, resumed the patronage of the Great Lavra and bestowed upon the monastery its first charter in 972. This charter, which is kept at the Protaton in Karyes today, is also known as the Tragos ('goat'), since it was written on goatskin parchment. Athanasios, spurred by a divine vision, returned at once to Athos as a hegumen (head monk) and introduced a typicon for cenobites, based on those compiled by Theodore Studites and Basil of Caesarea.

He died during an accident, killed by falling masonry, when the cupola of his church collapsed. Upon his death, Athanasios was glorified as a saint. His feast day is 5 July.

== Sites ==
The Saint Athanasius Bridge (Greek: Γεφύρι του Αγίου Αθανασίου του Αθωνίτη) is a historic bridge located about 5–6 km from the main compound of the Great Lavra. Its construction is traditionally attributed to Athanasius the Athonite.

== Hagiographies ==
There are two surviving vitae of Athanasius the Athonite.

- Vita A (MS BHG 187), written by the monk Athanasios of the Panagiou Monastery, Constantinople, during the early 11th century
- Vita Β (MS BHG 188), written by an anonymous at the Great Lavra, between 1050 and 1150; translated into English by Alice-Mary Talbot (2016)
