= Protaton =

Main church building in Karyes, Mount Athos

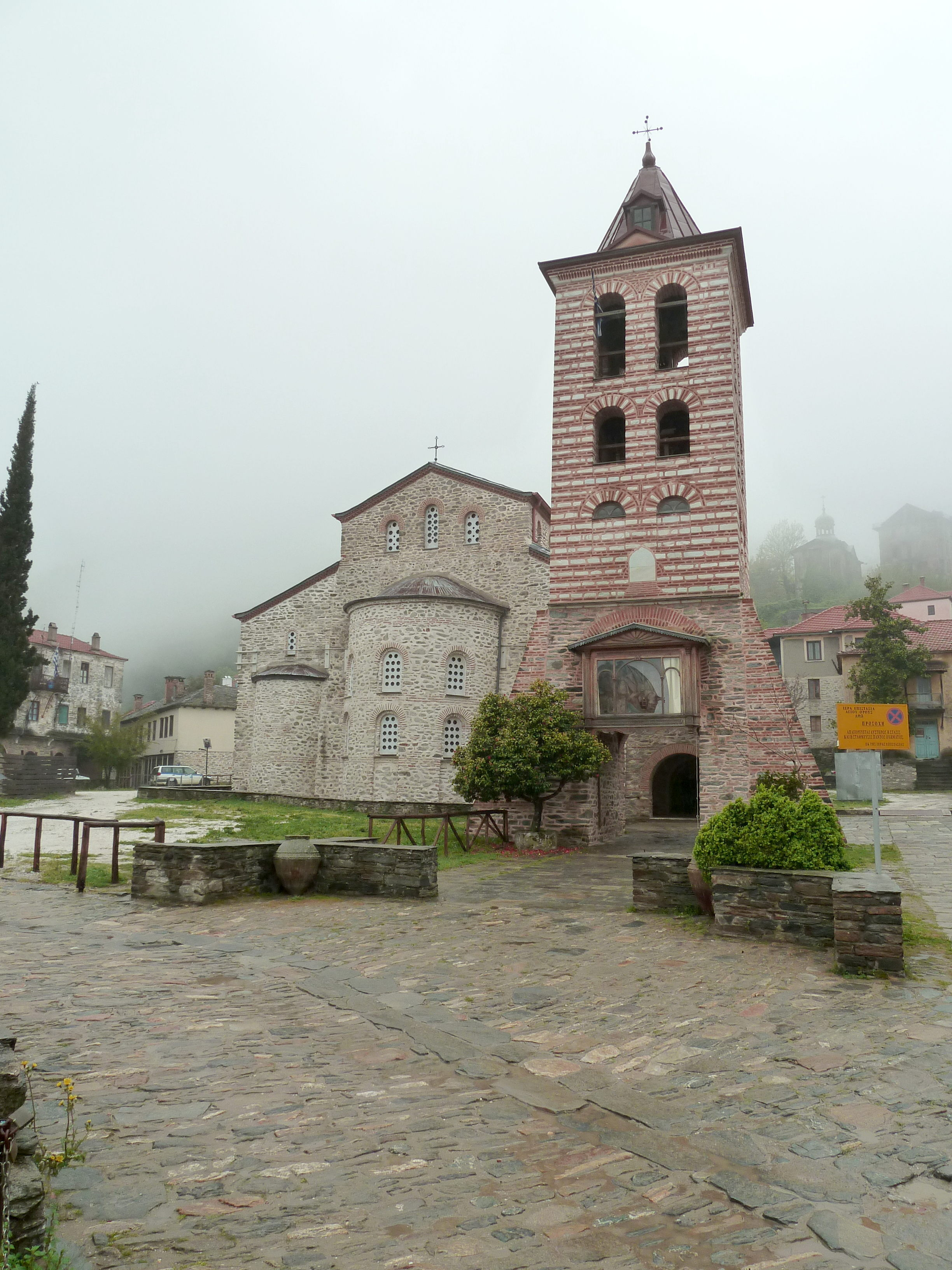
- Protaton
- 40.2572°N 24.2453°E
- Location: Karyes, Mount Athos
- Country: Greece
- Denomination: Eastern Orthodox

History
- Founded: 10th century AD

The Protaton (Greek: Πρωτάτο), also known as the Dormition of the Theotokos Church (Greek: Ναός Κοίμησης της Θεοτόκου), is the main church of Karyes, Mount Athos. It also serves as the ecclesiastical seat of the Protos, or the primate of the monastic community of Mount Athos. It was founded in the early 10th century AD, prior to the completion of the Great Lavra in 963.

The Protaton is known for its various frescoes, paintings, relics, and icons, particularly the Axion Estin icon. Many important manuscripts and historical documents, including the various historical typikons of Mount Athos are also kept in the Protaton.

== Gallery ==
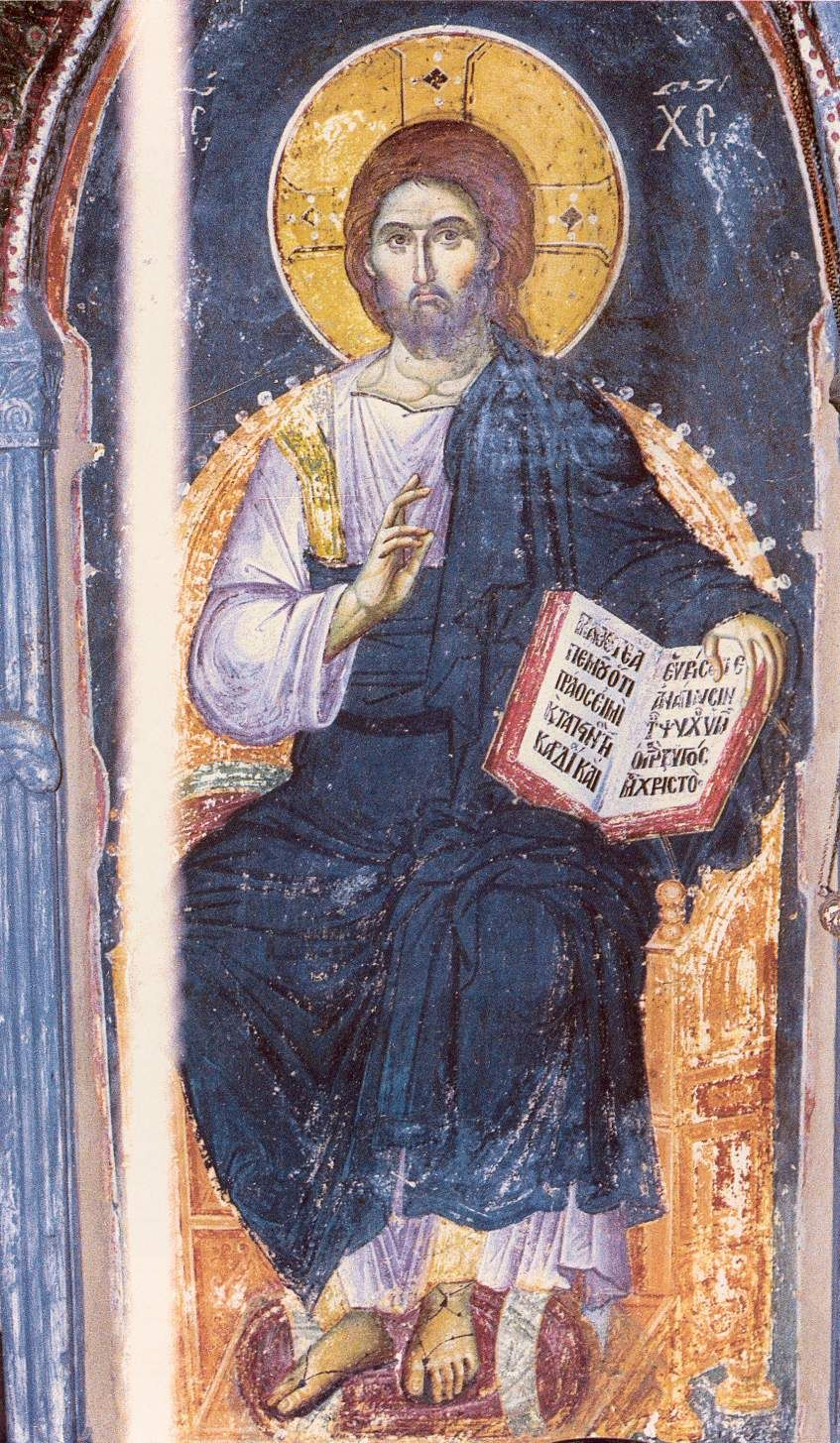

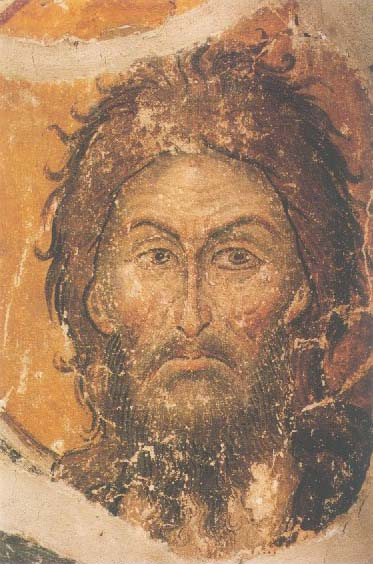

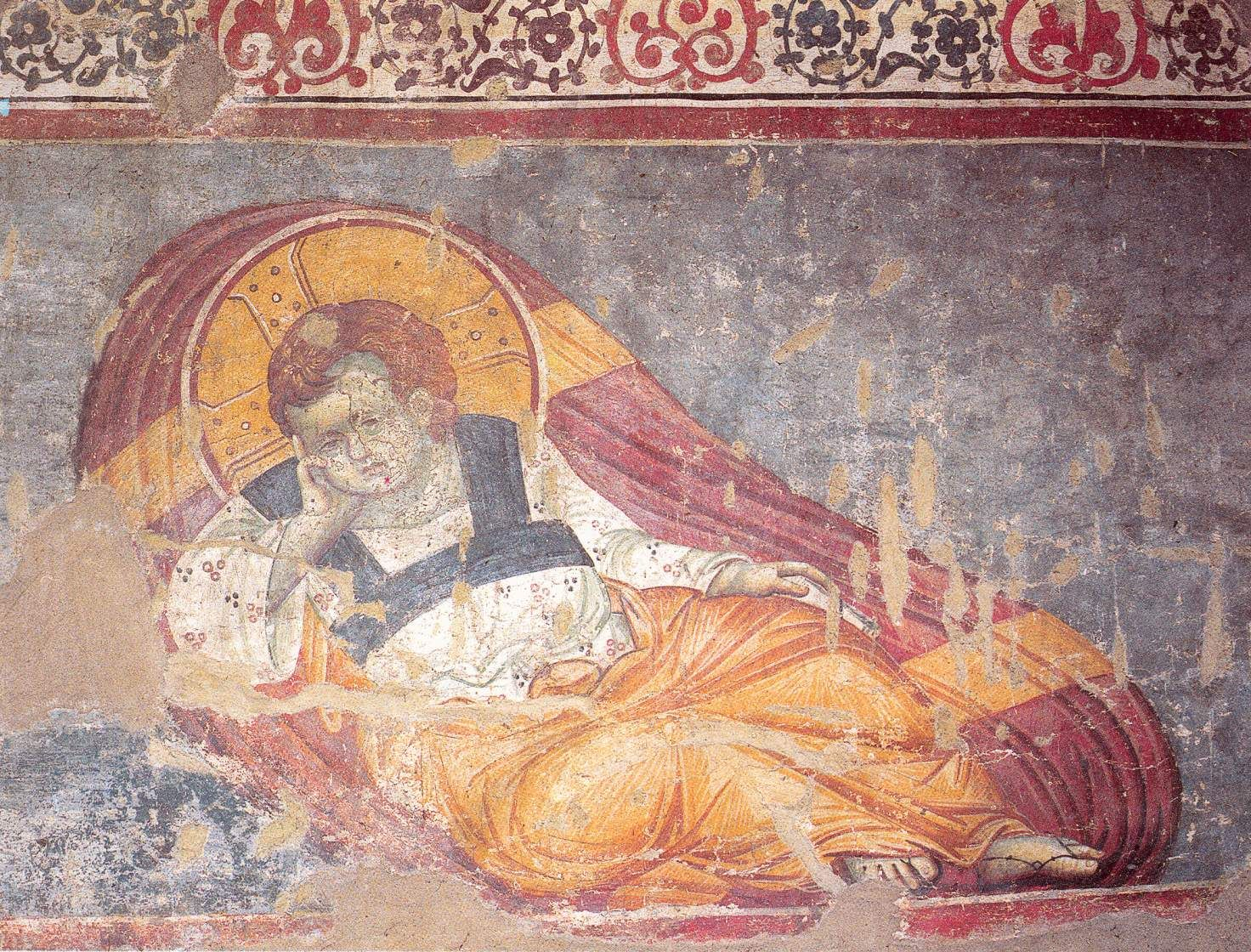

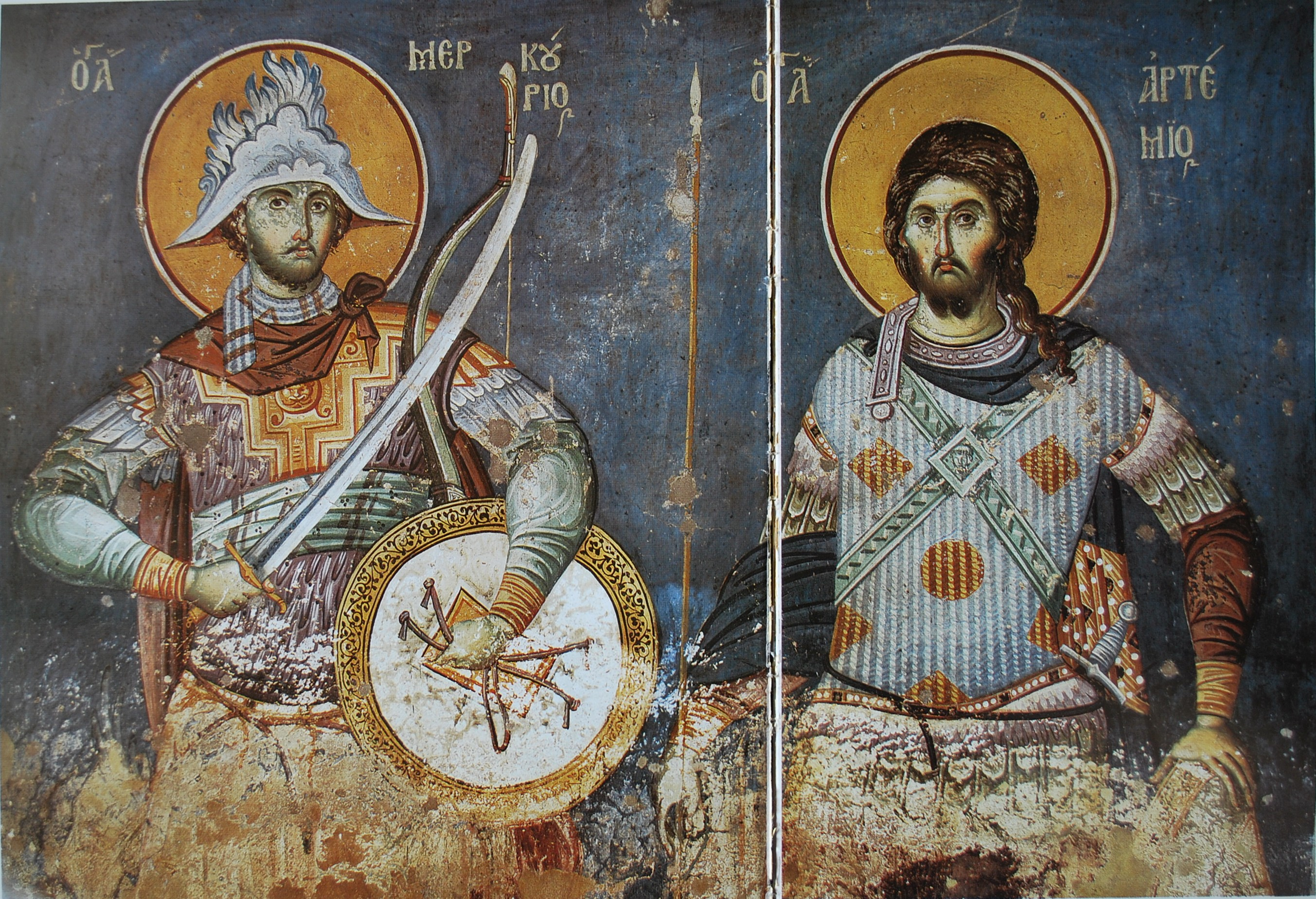

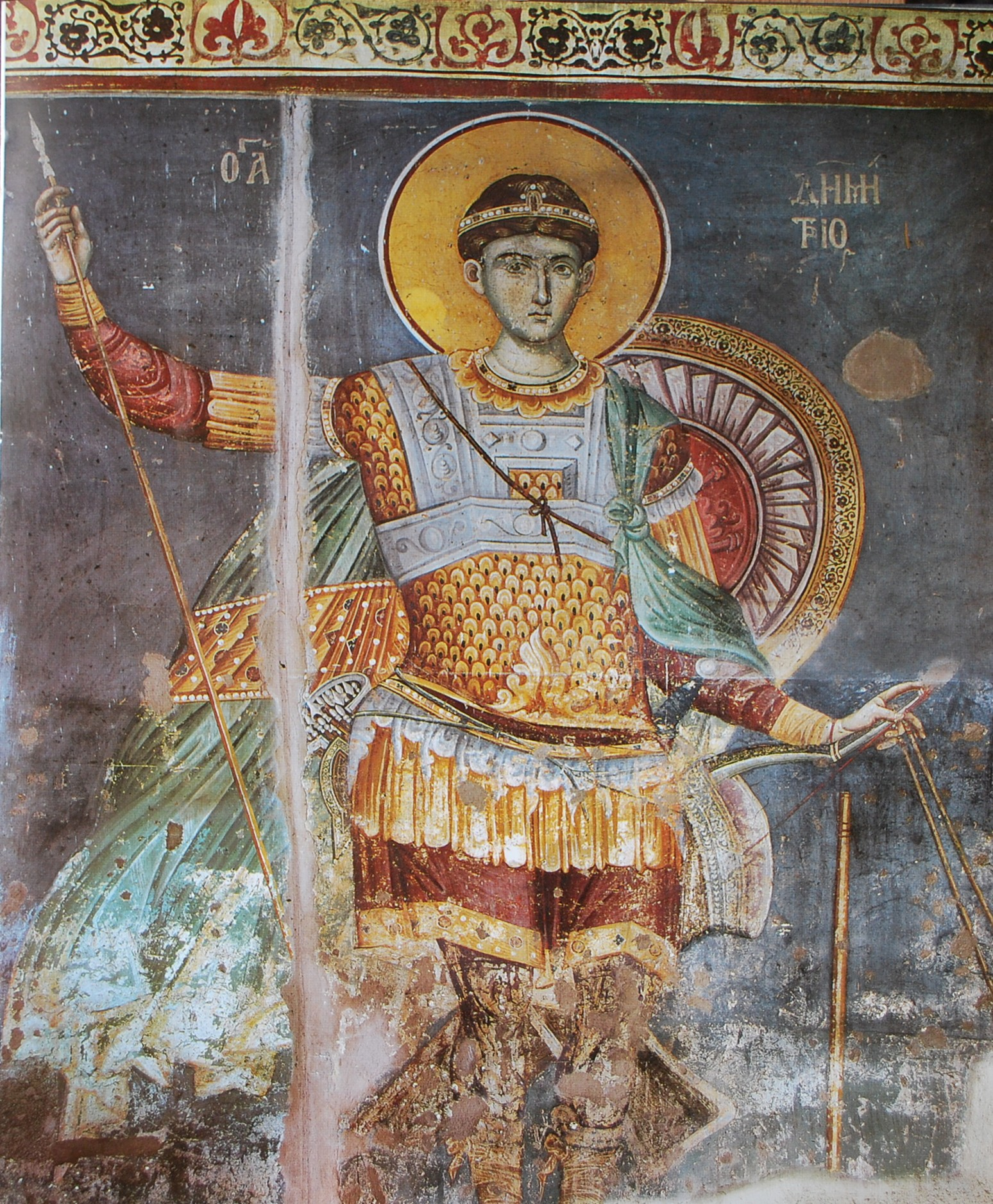

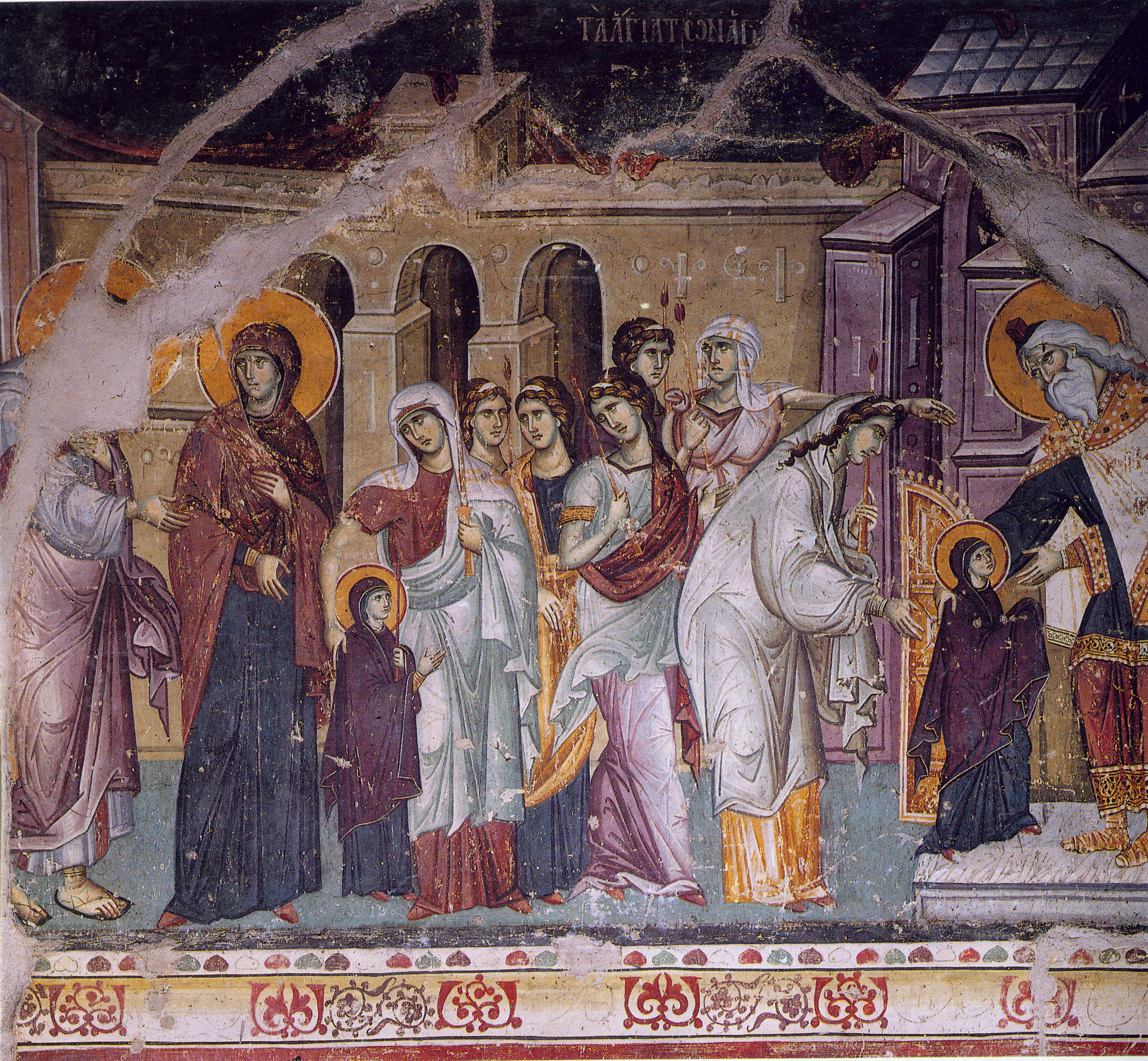

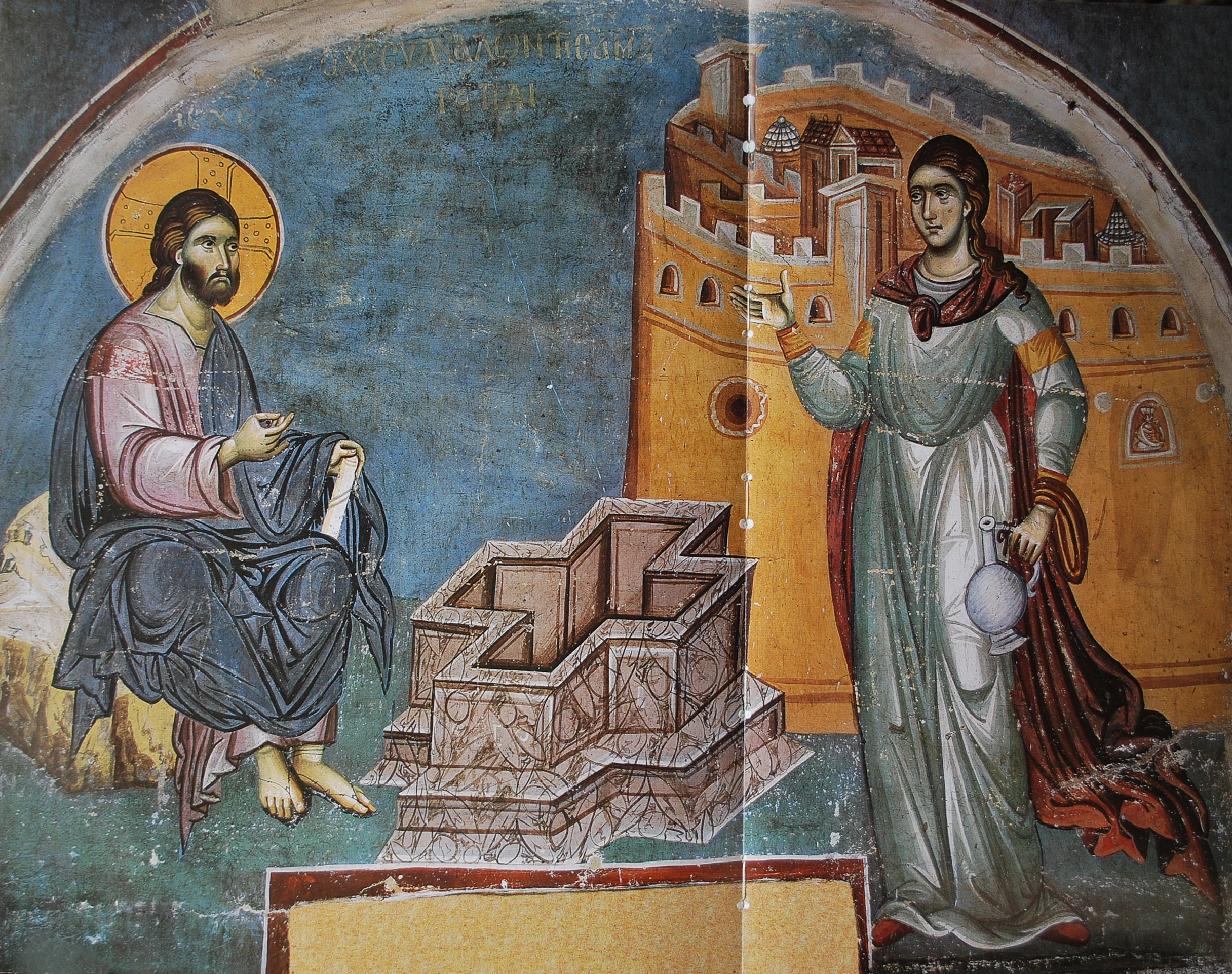

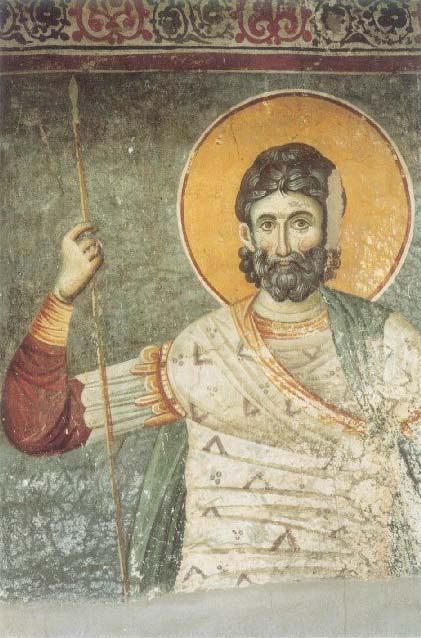

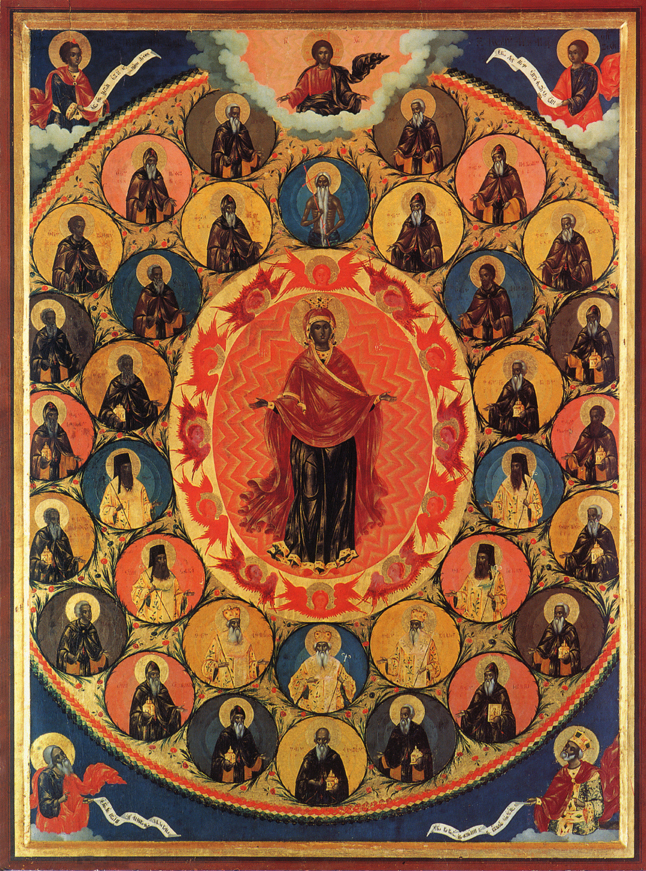

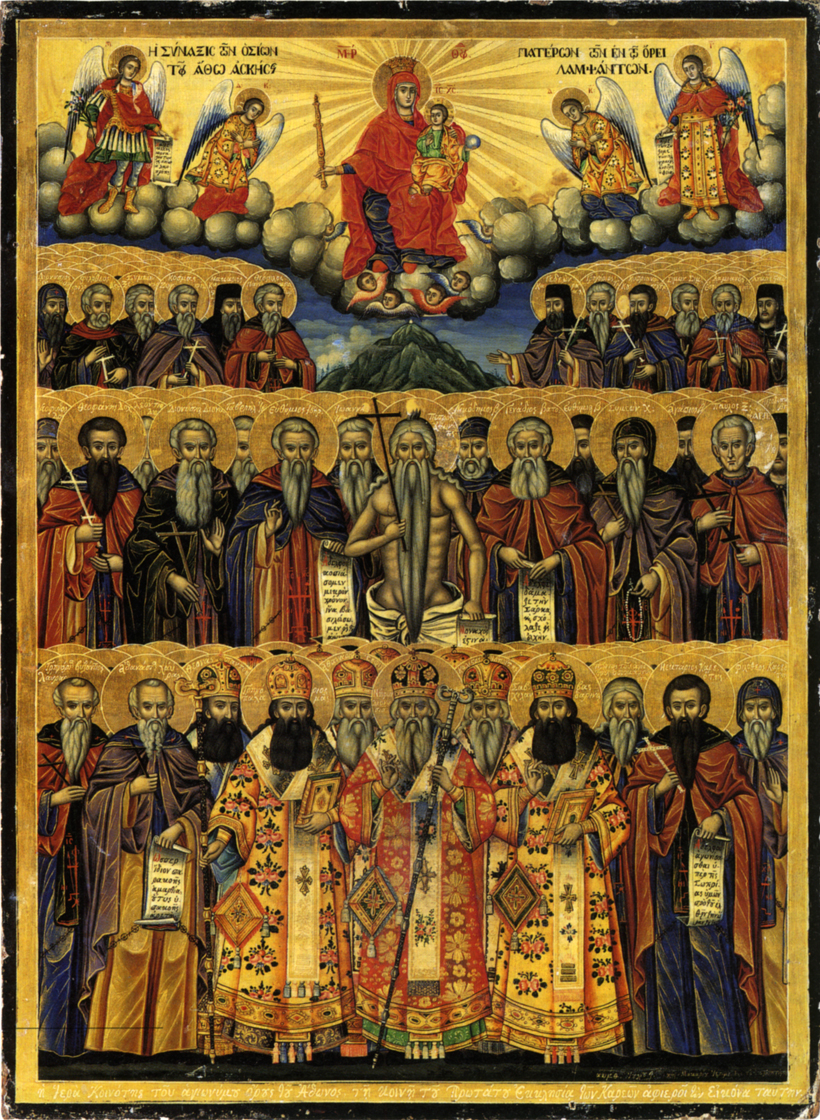

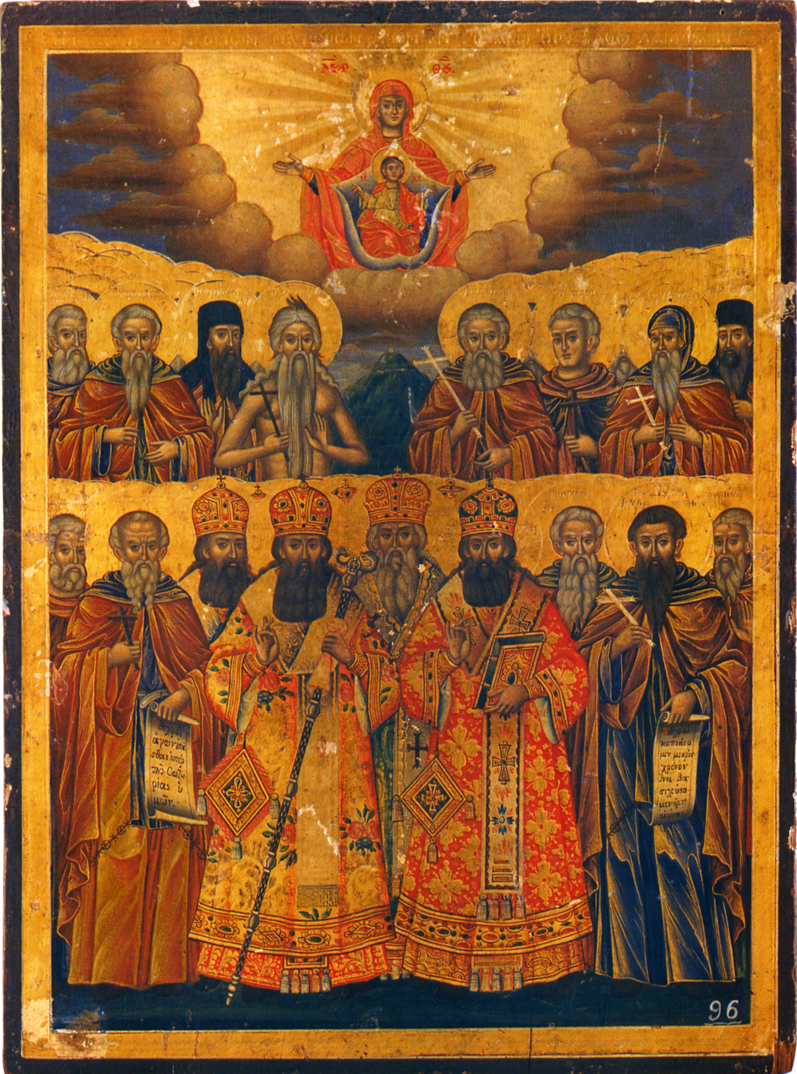

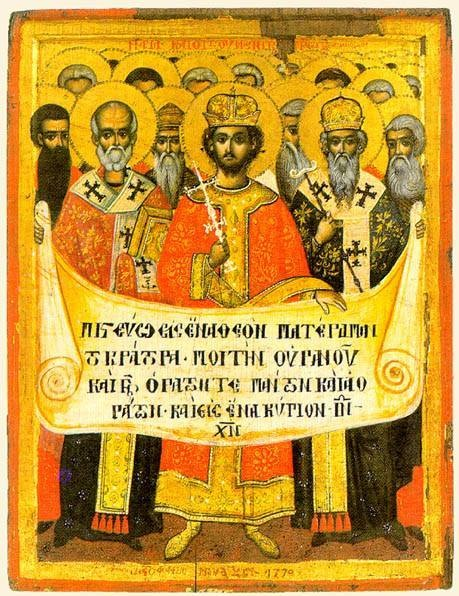
