= Battle of Andrassos =

960 battle between Byzantium and Aleppo

- Part of the Arab–Byzantine wars
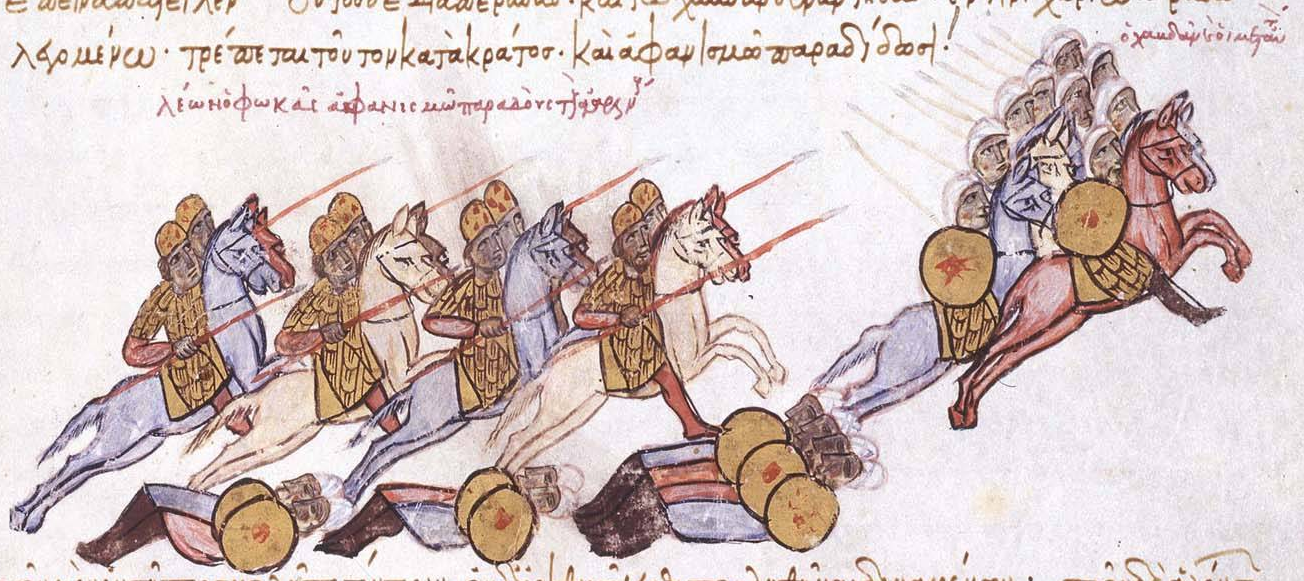
- Depiction of the flight of Sayf al-Dawla from the Madrid Skylitzes
Date	8 November 960
Location	Near Andrassos or Adrassos, in the pass of Kylindros (unidentified (Note: The Arab sources call the pass Darb maghārat al-kuḥl or al-kudjuk; the Byzantine sources either name it "Andrassos" (Ἀνδρασσός) after a nearby fortress or refer to it as the "defile called Kylindros" (Κύλινδρος). The location has been long disputed: Schlumberger placed it in the eastern Taurus range; William Mitchell Ramsay suggested identifying Andrassos with Adrasus in Isauria (modern Balabolu on Mount Adras Dağı) and Kylindros with Kelenderis in Cilicia, but this was rejected by Ernst Honigmann and Marius Canard as it would have placed Sayf al-Dawla's flight route by the Byzantine stronghold of Seleucia, as well as having to pass by Tarsus, whereas it is clearly stated that he fled to Syria by way of al-Massissa (Mopsuestia), further east of Tarsus; Honigmann suggested identifying Andrassos with the pass still known in the early 20th century as al-Kussuk, near Çayhan, but later rejected his own hypothesis, as well as that of Canard identifying it with Ince Mağara on the left bank of the Saros River. The issue remains unresolved,. Themodern editors of the Tabula Imperii Byzantini volume for Cappadocia consider Kylindros as an unidentified location that "must be sought on a route from Ariaratheia via Kukusos to Mopsuestia".))
Result	Byzantine victory

Belligerents
Byzantine Empire	Hamdanid Emirate of Aleppo

Commanders and leaders
Leo Phokas the Younger; Constantine Maleinos	Sayf al-Dawla

Strength
Unknown, but considerably fewer	Variously from 3,000 to 30,000

Casualties and losses
Light	Very heavy; reportedly, only 300 cavalrymen escaped

The Battle of Andrassos or Adrassos was fought on 8 November 960 between the Byzantines, led by Leo Phokas the Younger, and the forces of the Hamdanid Emirate of Aleppo under the emir Sayf al-Dawla. It was fought in an unidentified mountain pass in the Taurus Mountains.

Sayf al-Dawla had established an emirate based in Aleppo in 945 and quickly emerged as the leading Muslim antagonist of the Byzantine Empire on its eastern frontier. Both sides launched raids and counter-raids with alternating success: the Hamdanids invading the Byzantine provinces of Asia Minor, and the Byzantines raiding Hamdanid possessions in Upper Mesopotamia and northern Syria.

In mid-960, taking advantage of the absence of much of the Byzantine army on a campaign against the Emirate of Crete, the Hamdanid prince launched another invasion of Asia Minor. He raided deeply and widely into the region of Cappadocia. On his return, however, his army was ambushed by Leo Phokas at the pass of Andrassos. Sayf al-Dawla himself barely escaped, but his army was annihilated.

Following a series of Byzantine successes in the previous years, the battle of Andrassos is considered by many scholars to have finally broken the power of the Hamdanid emirate. Having lost much of his strength and increasingly beset by illness, Sayf al-Dawla would never again be able to raid as deeply into Byzantine territories. Led by Leo's brother Nikephoros Phokas, the Byzantines now launched a sustained offensive that by 969 had conquered Cilicia and northern Syria around Antioch, and resulted in the vassalization of Aleppo itself.

== Background ==
In the middle of the 10th century, after a period of expansion on its eastern frontier, led by John Kourkouas, at the expense of the Muslim border emirates, the Byzantine Empire was confronted by the Hamdanid prince Sayf al-Dawla. In 945, Sayf al-Dawla made Aleppo his capital and soon established his authority across northern Syria, much of the Jazira (Upper Mesopotamia), and what remained of the Abbasid Caliphate's frontier districts (thughūr) with Byzantium. Committed to the spirit of jihad, during the following two decades, the Hamdanid ruler emerged as the main enemy of the Byzantines. By his death in 967, Sayf al-Dawla was said to have fought against the Byzantines in over forty battles.

After his establishment in Aleppo, in winter 945–946 Sayf al-Dawla launched his first raid into Byzantine territory, but a truce was arranged and regular warfare between Sayf al-Dawla and the Byzantines began only in 948. Initially, the Byzantines were led by the Domestic of the Schools (commander-in-chief) Bardas Phokas the Elder, but although he was capable enough as a subordinate commander, his tenure as commander-in-chief proved largely a failure. In 948–950 the Byzantines scored a few successes, sacking the border fortresses of Hadath and Marash, and taking Theodosiopolis, putting an end to the Muslim border emirate there. Bardas's second son, Leo, distinguished himself in these years, leading the capture of Hadath and a raid that reached the outskirts of Antioch and defeated a Hamdanid army. In November 950, Leo scored a significant success against Sayf al-Dawla, who had previously advanced deep into Byzantine Asia Minor from Cilicia and defeated Bardas in battle. Leo ambushed the Hamdanid army during its return journey in a mountain pass; Sayf al-Dawla lost 8,000 men and barely escaped himself.

Sayf al-Dawla rejected the Byzantines' offers of peace and continued his raids. More importantly, he set about restoring the frontier fortresses of Cilicia and northern Syria, including at Marash and Hadath. Bardas Phokas repeatedly tried to hinder him but was defeated each time, even losing his youngest son, Constantine, to Hamdanid captivity. In 955, Bardas's failures led to his replacement by his eldest son, Nikephoros Phokas. Under the capable leadership of Nikephoros, Leo, and their nephew John Tzimiskes, the tide began to turn against the Hamdanid emir. In 956, Tzimiskes ambushed Sayf al-Dawla, but the Hamdanid army, fighting amidst torrential rain, managed to drive the Byzantines back; at the same time, however, Leo Phokas defeated and captured Abu'l-Asha'ir, a cousin of Sayf al-Dawla, near Duluk. The city of Hadath was sacked again in 957 and Samosata in 958, after which Tzimiskes scored a major victory over Sayf al-Dawla himself. In 959, Leo Phokas raided through Cilicia to Diyar Bakr and back to Syria, leaving a trail of destruction behind him.

== Sayf al-Dawla's invasion of Cappadocia ==
Map of the Arab–Byzantine frontier zone in south-eastern Asia Minor, with the major fortresses.

In the early summer of 960, Sayf al-Dawla saw an opportunity to reverse his recent setbacks and re-establish his position: the best troops of the Byzantine army, and Nikephoros Phokas himself, departed the eastern front for an expedition against the Emirate of Crete. With the Tarsiot troops, he launched an invasion of Byzantine territory from Cilicia, while his lieutenant Naja launched a parallel raid from Mayyafariqin in the western Jazira.

The task of confronting the Hamdanid emir fell on Leo Phokas, who according to the Byzantine chroniclers had been appointed as Domestic of the Schools of the West (i.e., of the European armies) following the accession of Romanos II in November 959 (with Nikephoros being named Domestic of the Schools of the East) and had just defeated a Magyar raid into Thrace in a daring night attack on their camp. The 11th-century Christian Arab chronicler Yahya of Antioch, however, reports that Leo had been appointed Domestic of the East and that he had remained on the eastern front throughout 959–960, leading raids into the Hamdanid domains up until the invasion of Sayf al-Dawla. The forces at Phokas' disposal are unknown but were considerably inferior in numbers to the army of the Hamdanid ruler.

At the head of a strong cavalry force—the numbers reported in the sources vary from 3,000 to as many as 30,000—Sayf al-Dawla invaded Byzantine territory, and advanced unopposed as far as the fortress of Charsianon, capital of the theme of the same name. There, he and his army sacked the fortress and massacred the garrison; they pillaged and torched the surrounding region and its settlements and took many prisoners. Other than Charsianon, the invasion appears to have avoided fortified centres and cities. According to the historian William Garrood, this fact, along with the great depth of penetration, and the long duration of the raid, points to it being "a grand campaign of destabilisation of the border" rather than an expedition with specific targets in mind. Indeed, Garrood opines that after Charsianon, Sayf al-Dawla appears to have turned to the west to maximize the area devastated during the raid.

Towards the end of autumn, Sayf al-Dawla finally began the journey home, taking his booty and prisoners with him. The contemporary Byzantine historian Leo the Deacon gives a vivid portrait of the Hamdanid prince, who, elated at the success of his raid and full of self-confidence, sped back and forth alongside his troops on his horse, a mare "of extraordinary size and speed", throwing his spear in the air and catching it again with remarkable dexterity.

== Ambush at Andrassos ==
In the meantime, Leo Phokas, heavily outnumbered by the Arab army, decided to rely once more on his proven ambuscade tactics, and occupied a position in the Arabs' rear, awaiting their return. Leo had been joined by the remaining forces of the adjoining provinces, including the theme of Cappadocia under its strategos, Constantine Maleinos, and occupied the narrow pass of Kylindros on the south-western Taurus Mountains between Cilicia and Cappadocia. The Byzantine troops occupied the local fort and hid themselves along the steep sides of the pass. According to the Arab chronicler Abu'l-Fida, this was the same pass that Sayf al-Dawla had crossed to begin his expedition, and many of his commanders advised against using it for the return as well; the Tarsiots even recommended that he should follow them on their own, different return route. Nevertheless, the Hamdanid prince, confident of his ability and judgment, had grown haughty and refused to heed any advice, seeking to reap the glory for this expedition alone. The Tarsiots withdrew and thus were preserved from the subsequent disaster.

On 8 November 960, the Hamdanid army entered the pass, where, according to Leo the Deacon, they "had to crowd together in the very narrow and rough places, breaking their formations, and had to cross the steep section each one as best he could". Once the entire Arab force, including their train and their captives, was in the pass, with the vanguard already nearing the southern exit, Leo Phokas gave the signal for the attack. With the trumpets blaring, the Byzantine soldiers raised cries and charged the Arab columns or threw rocks and tree trunks down the slopes on them. The ensuing battle was a complete rout. Many Arabs were killed—Leo the Deacon claims that their bones were still visible at the site years later—and even more were taken captive—John Skylitzes writes that so many prisoners were taken that the cities and farmsteads were filled with enslaved people. All the Christian captives were liberated and the booty recovered, while the treasure and baggage of Sayf al-Dawla himself were captured. The Hamdanid prince himself barely managed to escape; Theophanes Continuatus claims that he was saved when a Byzantine renegade named John gave him his horse to escape, while Leo the Deacon reports that he threw gold and silver coins behind him to slow his pursuers.

According to the 13th-century Syriac chronicler Bar Hebraeus, of the great expedition he had mustered, Sayf al-Dawla returned to Aleppo with only 300 horse riders. Several of the most distinguished Hamdanid leaders fell or were captured at this battle. Some Arab sources mention the capture of Sayf al-Dawla's cousins Abu'l-Asha'ir and Abu Firas al-Hamdani. Still, most chroniclers and modern scholars place these events on different occasions (in 956 for Abu'l-Asha'ir, and 962 for Abu Firas). His nephew Muhammad, son of Nasir al-Dawla, was captured, while the qadi of Aleppo, Abu'l-Husayn al-Raqqi, was taken prisoner or fell in battle according to different accounts. Bar Hebraeus also records the deaths of the commanders "Hamid ibn Namus" and "Musa-Saya Khan".

Leo Phokas released the Byzantine prisoners after providing them with provisions. They took the booty and Arab prisoners back to Constantinople, where he celebrated a triumph at the Hippodrome. Indeed, the battle of Andrassos made a deep impression among contemporaries, provoking outbursts of celebration in the Empire and grief and lamentation in the Syrian cities; it is mentioned by all historical sources of the time, and upheld in the contemporary Byzantine treatise De velitatione bellica ("On Skirmishing Warfare") as one of the chief examples of a successful ambush.

== Aftermath ==
Both contemporary Arab and modern historians, such as Marius Canard and J. B. Bikhazi, have commonly considered the defeat at Andrassos as a decisive engagement that destroyed Hamdanid offensive abilities for good and opened the path for Nikephoros Phokas' subsequent exploits. The disasters inflicted on Sayf al-Dawla by the Byzantines over the following years are regarded as an inevitable consequence of this battle. Garrood, on the other hand, argues that the Hamdanid ruler had been able to recover from similar failures on previous occasions and that the forces of Naja and his Tarsiot allies remained intact; furthermore, unlike the disasters that followed, his authority does not appear to have been challenged in the aftermath of the battle.

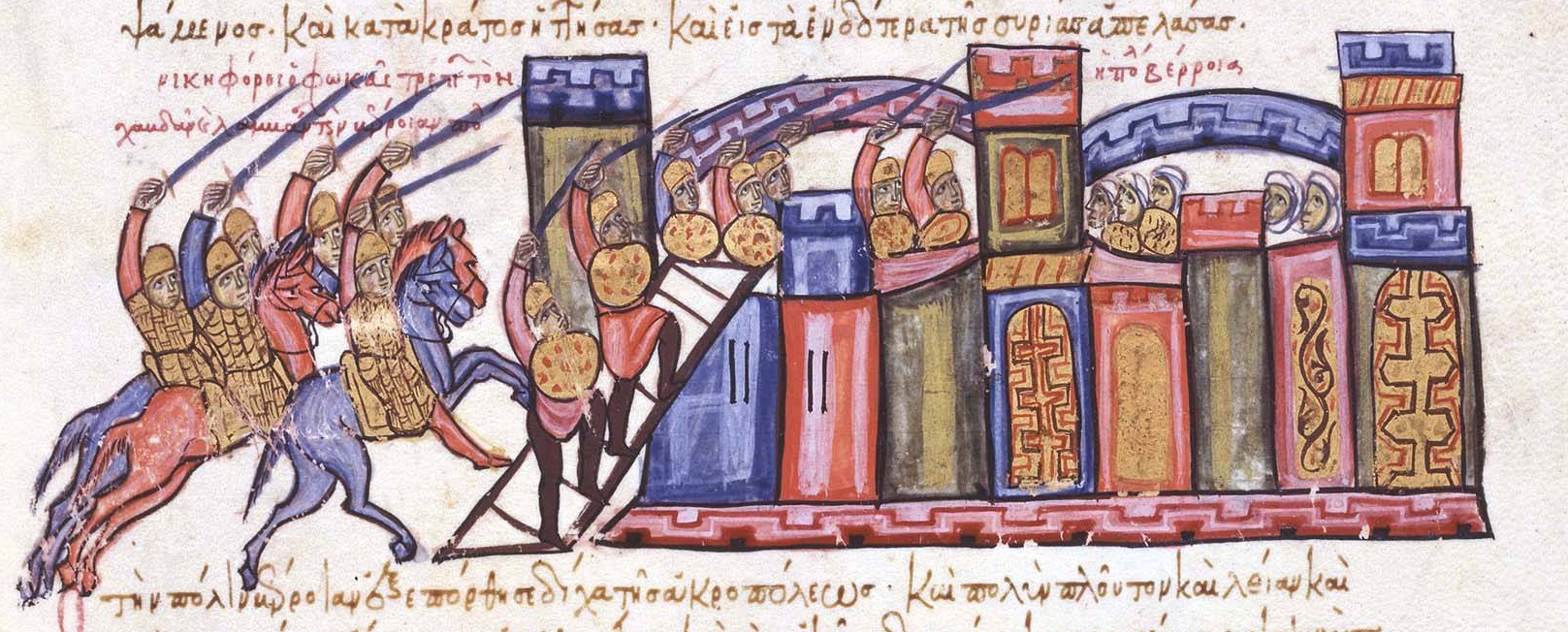
The capture of Aleppo by the Byzantines in late 962, from the Madrid Skylitzes

Nevertheless, Sayf al-Dawla's 960 raid was the last of this scale and ambition, and the Byzantines did not allow him to recover his strength: as soon as Nikephoros Phokas returned victorious from Crete in mid-961, he resumed the offensive in the east. The Byzantines captured Anazarbus in Cilicia and followed a deliberate policy of devastation and massacre to drive the Muslim population away. Sayf al-Dawla's attempts to halt the Byzantine advance in Cilicia failed, and Nikephoros Phokas, with an army reportedly 70,000 strong, took Marash, Sisium, Duluk, and Manbij, securing the western passes over the Anti-Taurus Mountains. Sayf al-Dawla sent his army north under Nadja to meet the Byzantines, but Nikephoros ignored them. Instead, the Byzantine general led his troops south, and in mid-December, they suddenly appeared before Aleppo. There, they defeated an improvised army before the city walls. The Byzantines stormed the city and plundered it, except for the citadel, which continued to hold out. The Byzantines departed in early 963, taking much of the populace with them as captives. In 963, following the death of Emperor Romanos II, Nikephoros turned his attention to the power struggle that saw him ascend the imperial throne.

The previous years' defeats, particularly the sack of Aleppo, had dealt an irreversible blow to Sayf al-Dawla's power and authority. Until his death, Sayf al-Dawla's rule would be plagued by revolts and disputes between his subordinates. At the same time, the Hamdanid prince also suffered from physical decline, with the onset of hemiplegia, as well as worsening intestinal and urinary disorders, that confined him to a litter. The disease limited Sayf al-Dawla's ability to intervene personally in the affairs of his state; he soon abandoned Aleppo to the charge of his chamberlain, Qarquya, and spent most of his final years in Mayyafariqin, leaving his senior lieutenants to carry the burden of warfare against the Byzantines and the various rebellions that increasingly occurred in his domains.

In autumn 964, Nikephoros, now emperor, campaigned in the east. Mopsuestia was besieged but held out. Nikephoros returned in the next year, stormed the city, and deported its inhabitants. On 16 August 965, Tarsus was surrendered by its inhabitants. Cilicia became a Byzantine province, and Nikephoros re-Christianized it. Amidst rebellions and Byzantine raids as far as the Jazira, Sayf al-Dawla died at Aleppo in February 967.

His son and successor, Sa'd al-Dawla, faced constant internal turmoil, and he did not secure control of his capital until 977. On 28 October 969, Antioch fell to the Byzantines. The fall of the great metropolis of northern Syria was soon followed by a treaty between the Byzantines and Qarquya, the ruler of Aleppo, which made the city a tributary vassal. Byzantine rule was extended over the entirety of the former thughūr, as well as the coastal strip of Syria between the Mediterranean Sea and the Orontes River until the environs of Tripoli, Arqa, and Shayzar. The rump Emirate of Aleppo was left almost powerless and became a bone of contention between the Byzantines and the new power of the Middle East, the Fatimid Caliphate of Egypt.

== Sources ==
- Bianquis, Thierry (1997). "Sayf al-Dawla". In Bosworth, C. E.; van Donzel, E.; Heinrichs, W. P. & Lecomte, G. (eds.). The Encyclopaedia of Islam, Second Edition. Volume IX: San–Sze. Leiden: E. J. Brill. pp. 103–110. ISBN 978-90-04-10422-8.
- Garrood, William (2008). "The Byzantine Conquest of Cilicia and the Hamdanids of Aleppo, 959–965". Anatolian Studies. 58: 127–140. doi:10.1017/s006615460000870x. ISSN 0066-1546. JSTOR 20455416. S2CID 162596738.
- Hild, Friedrich; Restle, Marcell (1981). Tabula Imperii Byzantini, Band 2: Kappadokien (Kappadokia, Charsianon, Sebasteia und Lykandos) (in German). Vienna: Verlag der Österreichischen Akademie der Wissenschaften. ISBN 978-3-7001-0401-8.
- Hild, Friedrich; Hellenkemper, Hansgerd (1990). Tabula Imperii Byzantini, Band 5: Kilikien und Isaurien (in German). Vienna: Verlag der Österreichischen Akademie der Wissenschaften. ISBN 978-3-7001-1811-4.
- Honigmann, E. (1935). Byzance et les Arabes, Tome III: Die Ostgrenze des Byzantinischen Reiches von 363 bis 1071 nach griechischen, arabischen, syrischen und armenischen Quellen (in German). Brussels: Éditions de l'Institut de Philologie et d'Histoire Orientales.
- Kennedy, Hugh (2004) [1986]. The Prophet and the Age of the Caliphates: The Islamic Near East from the 6th to the 11th Century (Second ed.). Harlow: Longman. ISBN 978-0-582-40525-7.
- Lilie, Ralph-Johannes; Ludwig, Claudia; Pratsch, Thomas; Zielke, Beate (2013). Prosopographie der mittelbyzantinischen Zeit Online. Berlin-Brandenburgische Akademie der Wissenschaften. Nach Vorarbeiten F. Winkelmanns erstellt (in German). Berlin and Boston: De Gruyter.
- Markopoulos, A. (1979). "Le témoignage du Vaticanus gr. 163 pour la période entre 945–963". Byzantina Symmeikta (in French). 3: 83–119. doi:10.12681/byzsym.663. ISSN 1105-1639.
- Schlumberger, Gustave (1890). Un empereur byzantin au dixième siècle, Nicéphore Phocas (in French). Paris: Librairie de Firmin-Didot et Cie.
- Stouraitis, Ioannis (2003). "Battle at the Straights of Andrasus, 960". Encyclopedia of the Hellenic World. Foundation of the Hellenic World. Archived from the original on 19 January 2019.
- Talbot, Alice-Mary; Sullivan, Dennis F., eds. (2005). The History of Leo the Deacon: Byzantine Military Expansion in the Tenth Century. Washington, DC: Dumbarton Oaks. ISBN 978-0-88402-324-1.
- Treadgold, Warren (1997). A History of the Byzantine State and Society. Stanford, California: Stanford University Press. ISBN 0-8047-2630-2.
- Wallis Budge, Ernest A., ed. (1932). Bar Hebraeus' Chronography: Translated from Syriac. London: Oxford University Press. Archived from the original on 22 June 2012.
- Whittow, Mark (1996). The Making of Byzantium, 600–1025. Berkeley and Los Angeles, California: University of California Press. ISBN 978-0-520-20496-6.
- Wortley, John, ed. (2010). John Skylitzes: A Synopsis of Byzantine History, 811–1057. Cambridge: Cambridge University Press. ISBN 978-0-521-76705-7.
