= Eustathios Maleinos =

Byzantine general

- Relatives: Constantine Maleinos (father), Nikephoros II Phokas and Leo Phokas (cousins), Bardas Phokas (nephew)
- Military career
- Allegiance: Byzantine Empire
- Rank: Strategos

Eustathios Maleinos (Greek: Εὐστάθιος Μαλεΐνος) was a leading Byzantine general and one of the wealthiest and most influential members of the Anatolian military aristocracy during the late 10th century. He held senior administrative and military posts in the East, and was involved in the aristocratic rebellions against Emperor Basil II (r. 976–1025), fighting against Bardas Skleros but supporting the revolt of his nephew Bardas Phokas. After the failure of the latter, he was not punished, but his immense wealth caused his eventual downfall, as Basil II confined him to a mansion in Constantinople and confiscated his wealth after his death.

== Biography ==
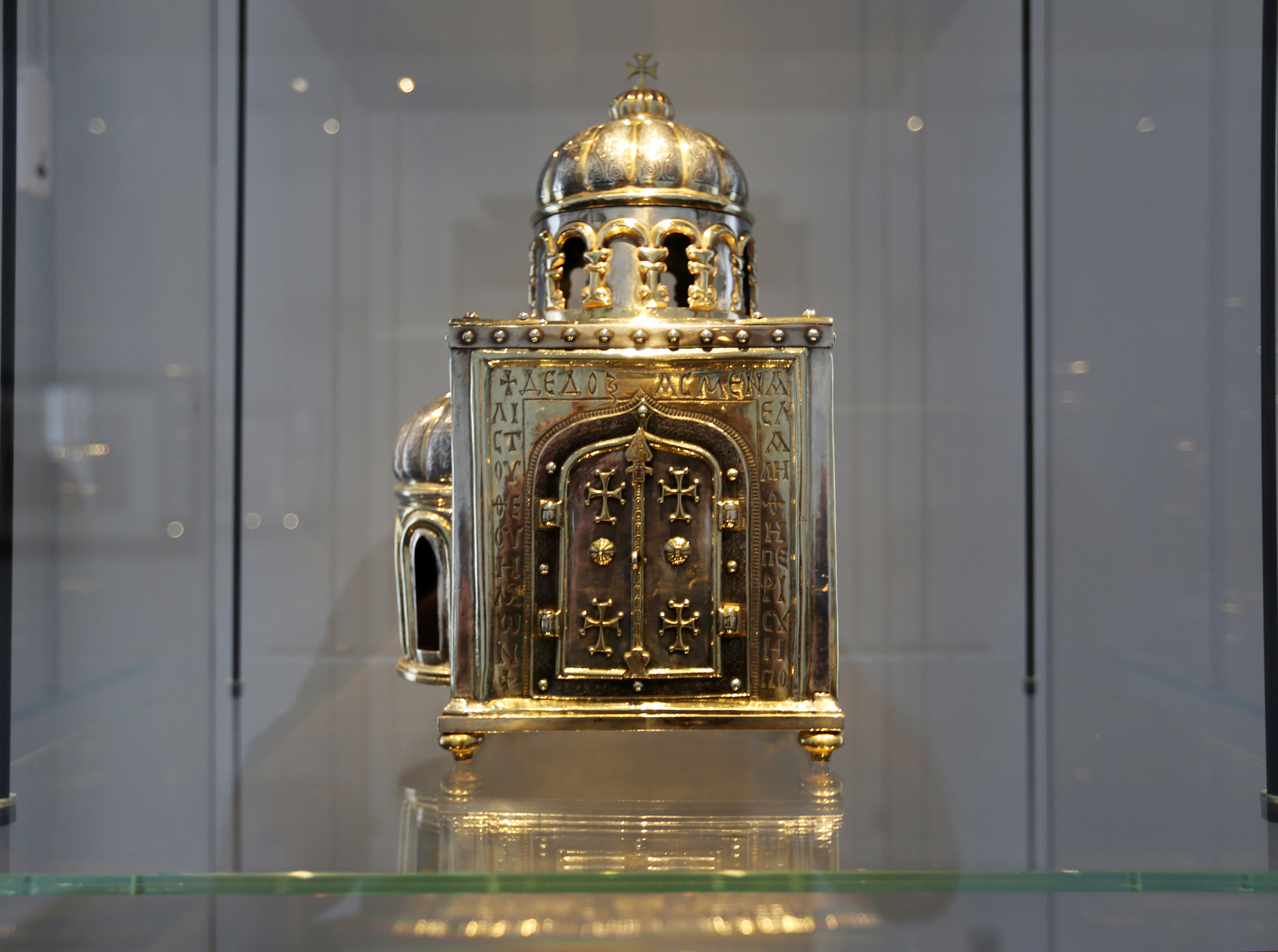
This silver lantern modelled after the Church of the Holy Sepulchre, was commissioned by Maleinos in 969/970 as recorded by the apse inscription: Κ(ΥΡΙ)Ε ΒΟΗΘΕΙ ΤΩ ΣΩ ΔΟΥΛΩ ΕΥΣΤΑΘΕΙΩ ΑΝΘΥΠΑΤΩ ΠΑΤΡΙΚ(ΙΩ) ΚΑΙ ΣΤΡΑΤΙΓΩ ΑΝΤΙΟΧΙΑΣ ΚΑΙ ΛΙΚΑΝΔΟΥ ("Lord, help your servant Eustathios, Anthypatos, Patrikios and Strategos of Antioch and Lykandos")

Eustathios was the son of Constantine Maleinos, a senior general and long-time governor of the theme of Cappadocia. The Maleinos family had by that time, chiefly through their close association with the Phokas clan, become one of the most important and influential clans in the land-holding aristocracy of Asia Minor (Anatolia), which provided Byzantium with most of its generals. Thus, Eustathios could count both on his family's considerable authority and its expertise in military matters to secure high office. He became strategos of the theme of Lykandos, before his cousin, Emperor Nikephoros II Phokas (r. 963–969) appointed him, alongside his original post, as the first Byzantine governor (doux) of Antioch after the city fell to the Byzantine Empire in October 969. About a year after the murder of Nikephoros II in December 969, Maleinos was transferred by his successor, John I Tzimiskes (r. 969–976) to the governorship of Tarsos in Cilicia, a post which he still held in 976, when the young Basil II became senior emperor.

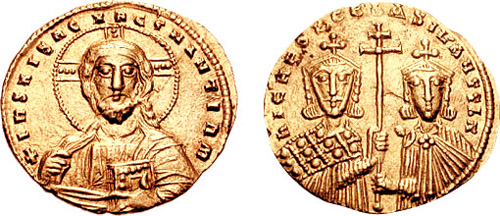
Gold histamenon coin depicting Nikephoros II Phokas and his son-in-law and junior co-emperor Basil II.

Basil's assumption of control over the imperial government did not go unchallenged by the military aristocracy, whose members, supported by the army, their large estates, and their extensive network of clients, had dominated it during the previous thirteen years, when Nikephoros Phokas and John Tzimiskes had ruled as nominal protectors of Basil and his younger brother, Constantine VIII. Thus, soon after Tzimiskes's death in January 976, his principal supporter, the Domestic of the East Bardas Skleros, was declared emperor. Maleinos, a Phokas adherent and hence opponent of Tzimiskes's supporters, remained loyal to Basil. Although he failed to prevent the rebel's outbreak from his original base around Melitene across the Anti-Taurus Mountains into Anatolia proper and suffered a heavy defeat at his hands in late summer 976, Maleinos continued to serve as a loyalist general until the revolt's final suppression in 979.

In order to successfully counter the rebel, however, Basil and his leading minister, the parakoimomenos Basil Lekapenos, had been forced to recall the general Bardas Phokas the Younger, the nephew of Emperor Nikephoros II, from exile in 978 and appoint him in command of the eastern armies. After his victory over Skleros, Phokas and his adherents now began plotting to overthrow the emperor. The conflict did not break out immediately, but both sides settled in what the historian Mark Whittow terms a "cold war". In 985, the emperor moved first by sacking or demoting a number of eastern generals loyal to the Phokas clan: Bardas Phokas himself was demoted to doux of Antioch and Eustathios Maleinos was discharged from the army. In 986, however, after the humiliating defeat of Basil himself by the Bulgarians at the Gates of Trajan and the return of Skleros from exile in Baghdad, the emperor was forced to re-appoint Bardas Phokas as commander-in-chief of the East. Phokas soon tricked Skleros into a meeting and placed him under arrest, but now the decisive conflict over the throne was inevitable: on 15 August or 14 September 987, in Maleinos's house in the Charsianon theme, the assembled leading aristocratic families proclaimed Phokas as emperor.

Phokas's rebellion spread quickly to all of Anatolia. Eventually Basil, in dire need of loyal troops, concluded a marriage alliance with the Kievan Rus': in exchange for his sister Anna, Vladimir of Kiev dispatched 6,000 Varangians with whom Basil managed to subdue the revolt, with Phokas himself falling in battle. With the exception of a few of the rebel's senior aides, Basil dealt relatively generously with the supporters of the Phokades. Thus, despite being one of Phokas's most prominent supporters, Maleinos was allowed to keep his court title of magistros and his extensive estates (Arab sources record that one of them stretched continuously from Claudiopolis in Bithynia to the Sangarios river, covering some 115 square kilometers).

In 995, however, as Emperor Basil II was returning from a campaign against the Fatimids in Syria, he stayed on Maleinos's estates. Maleinos lavishly provided for the needs of both the imperial retinue as well as the entire army from his own resources. Basil was greatly impressed and alarmed by this display of a subject's wealth and power; he took Maleinos with him to Constantinople as a virtual hostage, and in January 996, he issued a new law against the unlawful appropriation of communal village lands by the land-holding aristocracy, the so-called dynatoi ("powerful ones"), in a bid to reduce their power. Confined henceforth to the capital, Maleinos was well catered for, but, in the words of the chronicler John Skylitzes, "supplying him plentifully with everything he needed, Basil detained Eustathios as if he were nourishing a wild beast in a cage". After his death, his estates and fortune were confiscated by the emperor.

== Sources ==
- Holmes, Catherine (2005). Basil II and the Governance of Empire (976–1025). Oxford, United Kingdom: Oxford University Press. ISBN 978-0-19-927968-5.
- Kazhdan, Alexander Petrovich, ed. (1991). The Oxford Dictionary of Byzantium. New York, New York and Oxford, United Kingdom: Oxford University Press. ISBN 978-0-19-504652-6.
- Krsmanović, Bojana (11 September 2003). "Maleinos Family". Encyclopaedia of the Hellenic World, Asia Minor. Athens, Greece: Foundation of the Hellenic World.
- Magdalino, Paul, ed. (2003). Byzantium in the Year 1000. Leiden, The Netherlands: Brill. ISBN 90-04-12097-1.
- Whittow, Mark (1996). The Making of Byzantium, 600–1025. Berkeley and Los Angeles, California: University of California Press. ISBN 0-520-20496-4.

New title	Doux of Antioch; 969–970	Unknown Next known title holder: Kouleib (977)
