= Uncial 0167 =

- New Testament manuscript
- Text: Mark 4; 6 †
- Date: 7th century
- Script: Greek
- Now at: Great Lavra; University of Louvain
- Size: 28 x 25 cm
- Type: Alexandrian text-type
- Category: III

Uncial 0167 (in the Gregory-Aland numbering), is a Greek uncial manuscript of the New Testament, dated paleographically to the 7th century.

== Description ==
The codex contains a small part of the Gospel of Mark 4:24-29,37-41; 6:9-11,13-14,37-39,41,45, on 6 parchment leaves (28 cm by 25 cm). Leaves are in fragmentary condition. The text is written in two columns per page, 12 lines per page, in very large uncial letters.

The Greek text of this codex is a representative of the Alexandrian text-type. Aland placed it in Category III. It means it has a lot of alien readings.

Currently it is dated by the INTF to the 7th century.

The codex was divided and currently is housed in two places. One of its parts is still housed at the Great Lavra (Δ' 61) in Athos peninsula, the other is housed at the University of Louvain (Bibliothèque de l'Université, Sect. des Mss., frg. Omont no. 8) at Louvain.

It was described by Henri Omont (no. 8) and Kurt Treu.

== See also ==
- List of New Testament uncials
- Textual criticism
