= Mount Kyminas =

Mountain in Turkey

Mount Kyminas (Greek: Όρος Κύμινας) is the historical Byzantine name of a mountain in Bithynia, in present-day Bursa Province, Turkey. Its exact location is uncertain, although it was likely located somewhere slightly north of the city of Bursa. Christian ascetics and monks lived on the mountain during the Byzantine period. By the Ottoman period, Christian monks were no longer living at Mount Kyminas.

Christian monks who lived on the mountain included Athanasius the Athonite, Michael Maleinos (who was the abbot of the lavra at Mount Kyminas), and Thomas Dephourkinos.
