= Adrasus =

Town of ancient Cilicia

Coordinates: 36°39′20″N 33°07′47″E

Adrasus or Adrasos was a town of ancient Cilicia, and in the later province of Isauria, inhabited in Roman and Byzantine times. It later became a bishopric; no longer the seat of a residential bishop, it remains a titular see of the Roman Catholic Church.

Its site is located near Balabolu, Asiatic Turkey.
