= Great Lavra =

Monastery on Mount Athos, Greece

The Sacred Patriarchal and Stavopegial Monastery of Great Lavra
- Ἡ Ἱερὰ Πατριαρχικὴ καὶ Σταυροπηγιακὴ Μονὴ Μεγίστης Λαύρας
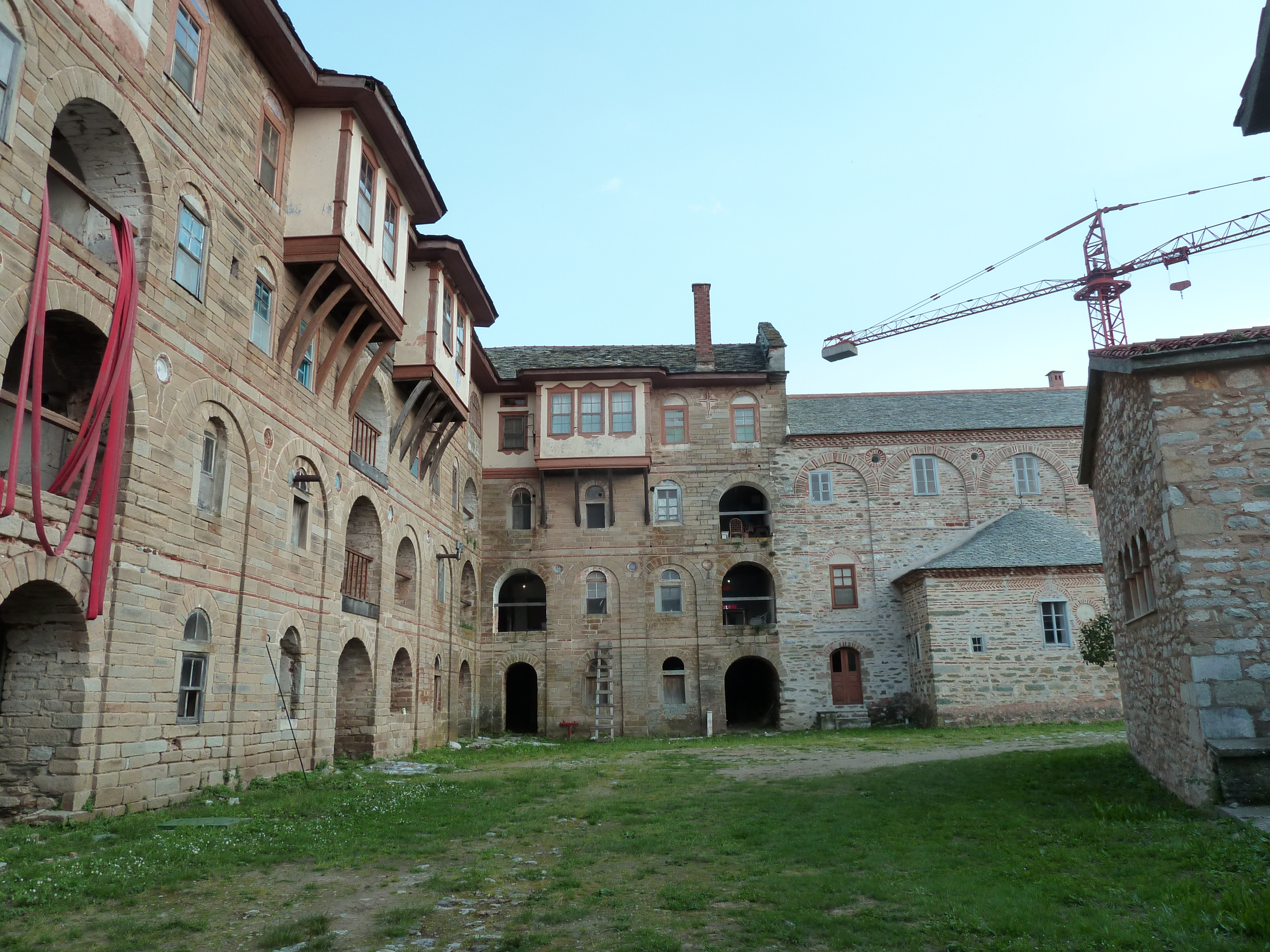
- External view of the monastery

- Location within Mount Athos

Monastery information
- Denomination: Eastern Orthodoxy
- Established: 963
- Dedication: Annunciation
- Archdiocese: Constantinople (Stavropegial)

People
- Founder: Saint Athanasius the Athonite
- Abbot: Archimandrite Prodromos
- Archbishop: Ecumenical Patriarch Bartholomew of Constantinople

Architecture
- Status: Open and functioning
- Heritage designation: UNESCO World Heritage Site
- Designated date: 1988

Site
- Location: Mount Athos
- Country: Greece
- Public access: Men only, with an access permit (διαμονητήριον)
- Website: Great Lavra at the Mount Athos website

The Monastery of Great Lavra (Greek: Μονή Μεγίστης Λαύρας, Moní Megístis Lávras) is the first monastery built on Mount Athos, on the Athos peninsula in geographical Macedonia, northeastern Greece. It is located on the southeastern foot of the Mount at an elevation of 160 metres (170 yd). The founding of the monastery in AD 963 by Athanasius the Athonite marks the beginning of the organized monastic life at Mount Athos.

At the location of the monastery, there was one of the ancient cities of the Athos peninsula, perhaps Akrothooi, from which the sarcophagi of the monastery that are in the oil storage house come. The history of the monastery is the most complete compared to the history of the other monasteries, because its historical archives were preserved almost intact. It is possible that the study of these archives may contribute to the completion of the knowledge of the history of other monasteries, whose archives were partially or completely lost.

== Founding ==
The founder of Great Lavra, Athanasius, began the construction of the buildings in 963, according to the will of his friend and Byzantine Emperor Nikephoros II Phokas who funded the project. Nikephoros had promised Athanasius that he would soon become a monk of Great Lavra but the circumstances and his death canceled those plans. However, a permanent imperial grant, which was doubled by John I Tzimiskes, allowed the integration of the buildings. The emperors gave also the Great Lavra many other lands of property including the island of Saint Eustratius and the Monastery of Saint Andreas in Thessaloniki. This led to the growth of the monks from 80 to 120.

== Later history ==
The building project, according to the biography of Athanasius the Athonite (11th century), began with the protective wall and continued to the church and cells. After Athanasius' death, the monastery continued its operation normally. The emperors favored its development and during the 11th century there were 700 monks, while smaller monasteries had been ceded to Great Lavra.

In the 14th century the monastery suffered, like all the other monasteries of Mount Athos, from Spaniards from the crown of Aragon and other pirates. Additionally, the Russian pilgrim Isaiah confirms that, by the end of the 15th century, the monastery was Greek. The result of the crisis was the formation of a peculiar way of monasticism, the Idiorrhythmic Way, despite the objections of the official Church and the emperors.

In 1574, the Patriarch of Alexandria, Sylvester, helped and the monastery operated again under cenobitic monasticism, but soon the peculiar monasticism was again introduced. In 1655, the Patriarch Dionysios III, who also became a monk, donated his personal fortune for the return to the cenobitic life but again these attempts were insufficient and the peculiar monasticism remained until the 20th century (1914), when there were new attempts for the return to the cenobitic life but without results.

Since 1980, the monastery has been cenobitic.

== Buildings ==
The main church (Katholikon) was founded by Athanasius who lost his life together with 6 other workers when one of the domes fell during the construction. The architectural style of the temple is characterized by the two large areas of the chorus and the prayer. This style was then consecrated and was copied by the other monasteries. The frescoes were made in 1535 by the great painter Theophanis. However, the narthex was painted in 1854.

North of the narthex (liti), there is the chapel of the Forty Martyrs of Sebaste in which there is the grave of Athanasius. South of the liti, there is the chapel of Saint Nicholas, painted by Franco Cantellano, in 1560. The trapeza opposite the central entrance has the shape of a cross and is the largest on Mount Athos. Its interior is full of frescoes, painted by Theophanis or his school.

== Art treasures ==
The library of the monastery is located behind the main church. It contains 2,116 Greek manuscripts and 165 codices. Among them uncial manuscripts of the New Testament: Codex Coislinianus, Codex Athous Lavrensis, Uncial 049, Uncial 0167, and minuscules 1073, 1505, 2524, 1519. There are also over 20,000 printed books, and about 100 manuscripts in other languages. The collection is one of the richest collections of Greek manuscripts in the world.

The vestry is behind the main church. Some of the most important artifacts are a manuscript of a gospel with a golden cover which is a gift from Nikephoros II Phokas and the list (Kouvaras) of the monks since Athanasius. There are also 2,500 icons which cover the whole history of hagiography of the second millennium.

== Climate ==
Great Lavra enjoys a sunny and warm Mediterranean climate (Köppen: Csa). Winter lows are particularly mild for its latitude with around 8 °C (46 °F) in January, while July and August highs are around 31 °C (88 °F). According to the National Observatory of Athens station data, Great Lavra falls in hardiness zone 10a.

Climate data for Great Lavra 143 m a.s.l.
Month	Jan	Feb	Mar	Apr	May	Jun	Jul	Aug	Sep	Oct	Nov	Dec	Year
Record high °C (°F)	21.7 (71.1)	22.8 (73.0)	23.2 (73.8)	28.5 (83.3)	30.9 (87.6)	36.6 (97.9)	39.1 (102.4)	38.9 (102.0)	35.8 (96.4)	29.2 (84.6)	26.1 (79.0)	23.1 (73.6)	39.1 (102.4)
Mean daily maximum °C (°F)	11.4 (52.5)	12.3 (54.1)	14.9 (58.8)	18.5 (65.3)	23.1 (73.6)	28.4 (83.1)	31.2 (88.2)	30.8 (87.4)	26.2 (79.2)	20.5 (68.9)	16.8 (62.2)	12.8 (55.0)	20.6 (69.0)
Daily mean °C (°F)	9.4 (48.9)	10.2 (50.4)	12.3 (54.1)	15.5 (59.9)	19.9 (67.8)	25 (77)	27.8 (82.0)	27.8 (82.0)	23.6 (74.5)	18.4 (65.1)	14.9 (58.8)	11 (52)	18.0 (64.4)
Mean daily minimum °C (°F)	7.5 (45.5)	8.2 (46.8)	9.8 (49.6)	12.5 (54.5)	16.7 (62.1)	21.7 (71.1)	24.5 (76.1)	24.8 (76.6)	21 (70)	16.4 (61.5)	13 (55)	9.2 (48.6)	15.4 (59.8)
Record low °C (°F)	−3.7 (25.3)	−1.2 (29.8)	−0.2 (31.6)	3.0 (37.4)	9.9 (49.8)	14.1 (57.4)	15.3 (59.5)	17.4 (63.3)	12.6 (54.7)	9.4 (48.9)	2.3 (36.1)	−0.2 (31.6)	−3.7 (25.3)
Average rainfall mm (inches)	122.5 (4.82)	76 (3.0)	67.4 (2.65)	52.7 (2.07)	43.6 (1.72)	30.6 (1.20)	27.4 (1.08)	18.2 (0.72)	49.5 (1.95)	72.2 (2.84)	106.1 (4.18)	127.9 (5.04)	794.1 (31.27)
Source: National Observatory of Athens (Apr 2015 - Nov 2025), Great Lavra N.O.A station.

== Namesakes ==
A plant species, Campanula lavrensis, is named after the Great Lavra.

== Gallery ==
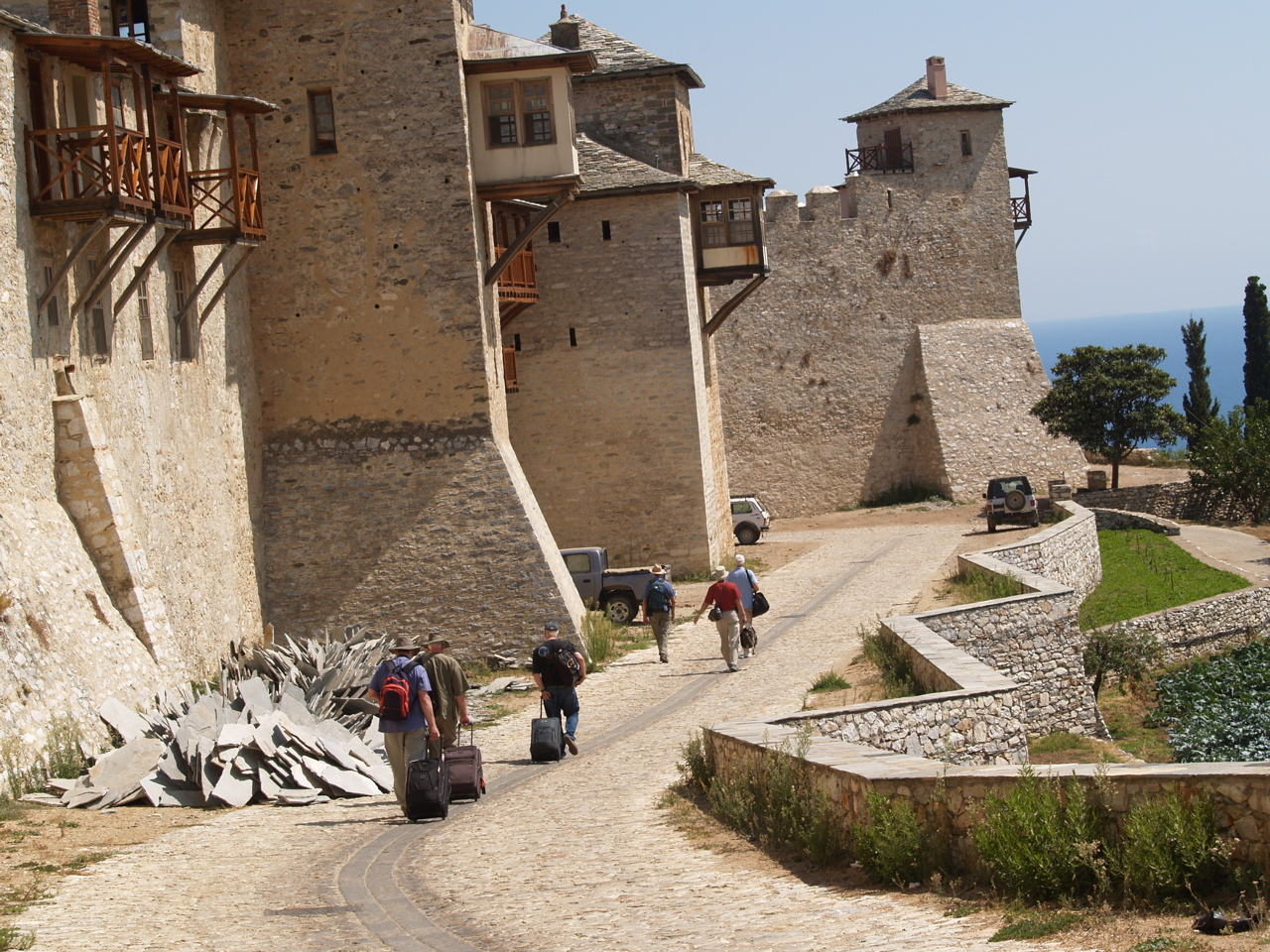
Road to the monastery

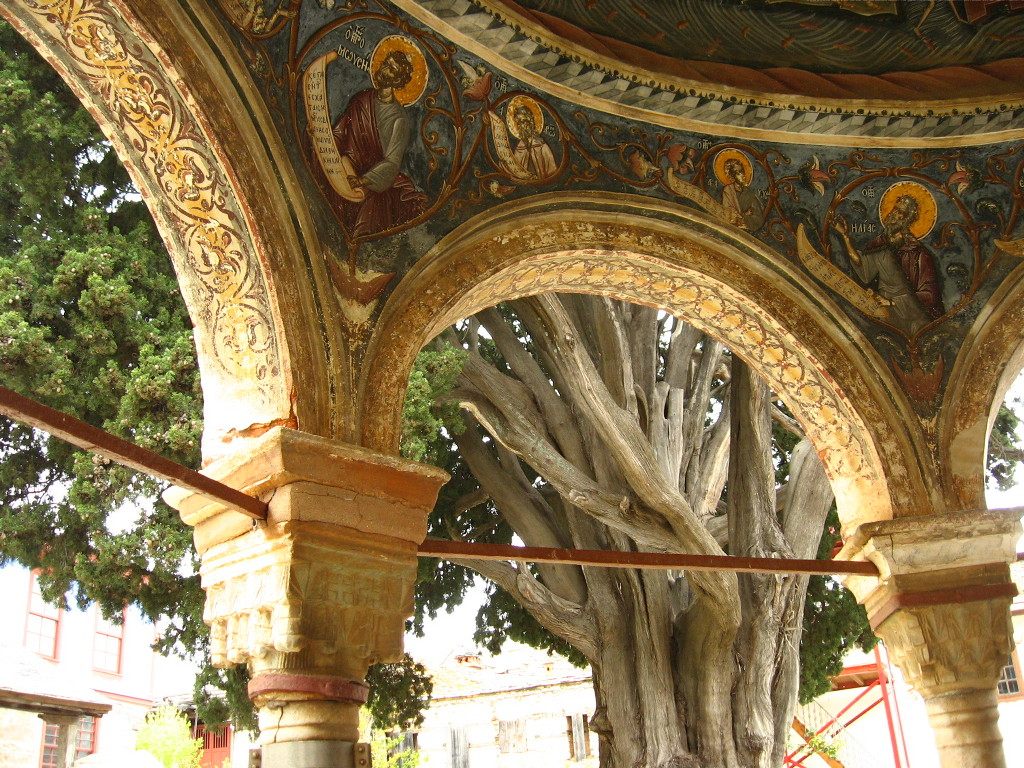
Cypress of St. Athanasius, as seen from the entrance in the church of Great Lavra. It is said to be over 1000 years old.

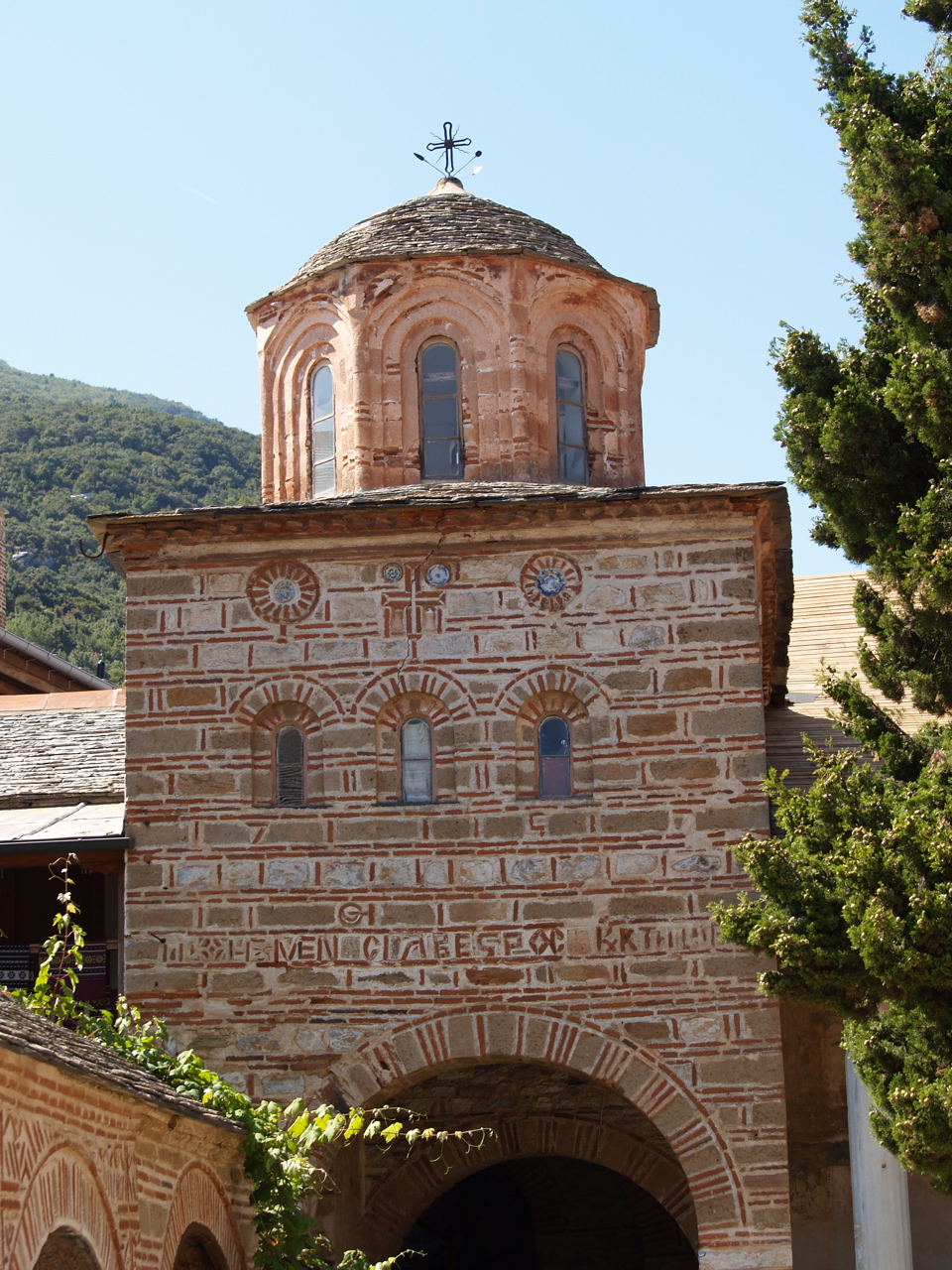
A gate

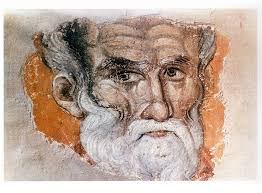
Saint Nicholas fresco (1560)

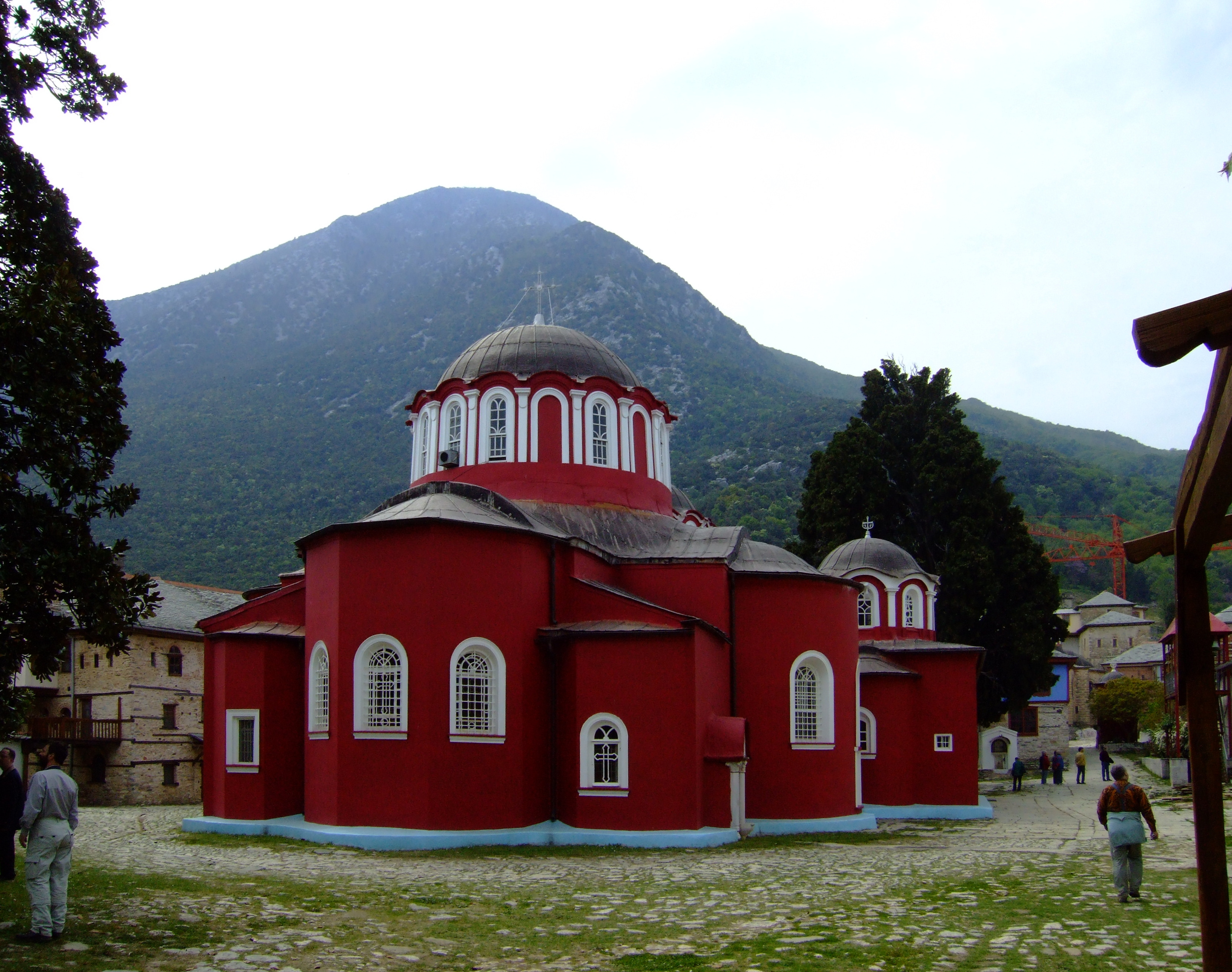
Main church of the monastery.

== See also ==
- Lavra
- Prodromos Skete, belonging to the Great Lavra
- Katounakia, belonging to the Great Lavra
- Karoulia, belonging to the Great Lavra
