= Siege of Aleppo =

Siege of Aleppo may refer to:

- Siege of Aleppo (637), during the Arab–Byzantine wars
- Siege of Aleppo (969), during the Arab–Byzantine wars by general Peter
- Siege of Aleppo (977) by Sa'd al-Dawla
- Siege of Aleppo (983) by Bakjur and the Fatimid Caliphate
- Siege of Aleppo (994–995) by the Fatimid Caliphate
- Siege of Aleppo (1024–1025) by Salih ibn Mirdas
- Siege of Aleppo (1071) by Alp Arslan
- Siege of Aleppo (1124–1125), during Baldwin II's reign of Jerusalem
- Siege of Aleppo (1138), by a joint Byzantine-Crusader force under John II Komnenos
- Siege of Aleppo (1174–1175), by Saladin
- Siege of Aleppo (1260), during the Mongol invasion of Syria led by Hulagu Khan
- Siege of Aleppo (1280), during the Mongol invasion of Syria led by Abaqa Khan
- Siege of Aleppo (1801), The siege of rebel Aleppo against the Ottomans
- Massacre of Aleppo (1850), a massacre committed by Muslim rioters against Christians and the bombardment by Ottoman forces on the rioters.
- Siege of Aleppo (1980), during the Islamic uprising in Syria
- Siege of Aleppo (2016), during the Syrian civil war

== See also ==
- Battle of Aleppo
- Sack of Aleppo
