= Capture of Aleppo =

Capture of Aleppo may refer to:

- Siege of Aleppo (637)
- Sack of Aleppo (962)
- Siege of Aleppo (1260)
- Sack of Aleppo (1400)
- Capture of Aleppo (1516)
- Battle of Aleppo (1918)
- Battle of Aleppo (2012–2016)
- Battle of Aleppo (2024)

== See also ==
- Battle of Aleppo
- Siege of Aleppo
- Sack of Aleppo
