= Siege of Aleppo (977) =

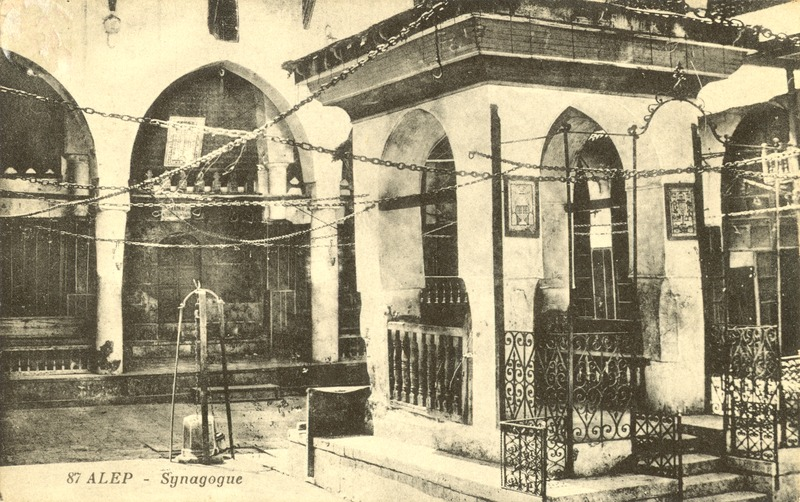
- Postcard of the courtyard of the Central Synagogue of Aleppo in Aleppo
Date	977
Location	Citadel of Aleppo
Result	Hamdanid victory

Belligerents
Bakjur forces	Hamdanid dynasty Banu Kilab

Commanders and leaders
Bakjur	Sa'd al-Dawla

The Siege of Aleppo In 977 was a decisive turning point in the history of the Hamdanid Emirate, in which Abu al-Ma'ali Sa'd al-Dawla successfully reclaimed the capital of his father Sayf al-Dawla, after years of fragmentation and internal turmoil.

== Background ==
Following Sayf al-Dawla death in 967, actual control of Aleppo fell to his vizier Qarghawayh, supported by Sayf al-Dawla's former retainers. As a result, Sa'd al-Dawla spent nearly ten years 968–977 without a state or capital.

In 975, Bakjur a Circassian Mamluk, overthrew Qarghawayh and imprisoned him in the Citadel of Aleppo, establishing his own dominance. This shift prompted Qarghawayh's supporters to invite Sa'd al-Dawla to return, while the widespread instability motivated him to retake his father's former capital.

== The Siege ==
Sa'd al-Dawla marched on Aleppo and subjected the city to a four month siege, relying heavily on the support of the Banu Kilab tribe. Throughout the blockade, Bakjur remained entrenched inside the Citadel of Aleppo, holding out against immediate surrender.

Negotiations soon opened between the two sides. Bakjur demanded safe passage for himself, his family, and his wealth, stipulating the governorship of Homs as compensation for surrendering the citadel. He also insisted that prominent leaders of the Banu Kilab serve as guarantors for the safe conduct agreement

== Aftermath ==
Following the surrender, Sa'd al-Dawla granted Bakjur safe passage, receiving the Citadel of Aleppo in exchange while Bakjur relocated to govern Homs. Sa'd al-Dawla then freed Qarghawayh from captivity, keeping him in service until his death around 990–991.

Taking control of the city, Sa'd al-Dawla prioritized Aleppo's reconstruction and security. He declared allegiance to the Buyid ruler Sa'd al-Dawla in Baghdad, who recognized him with robes of honor and the title Sa'd al-Dawla. Upon securing the realm, Sa'd al-Dawla also ended Aleppo's tribute payments to the Byzantine Empire.
