= Mansur ibn Lu'lu' =

Emir of Aleppo during the 11th century

Emir of Aleppo
- Reign: 1008 – January 1016
- Predecessor: Lu'lu' al-Kabir
- Successor: Fath al-Qal'i
- Died: after 1030
Names
- Manṣūr ibn Luʾluʾ
Regnal name
- Murtaḍā ad-Dawla
- Father: Lu'lu' al-Kabir

Manṣūr ibn Luʾluʾ (Arabic: منصور بن لؤلؤ), also known by his laqab (honorific epithet) of Murtaḍā ad-Dawla (مرتضى الدولة, 'Approved of the State'), was the ruler of the Emirate of Aleppo between 1008 and 1016. He succeeded his father Lu'lu' al-Kabir, with whom he had shared power. Unlike Lu'lu', however, Mansur's rule was opposed by Aleppo's notables, who chafed at his oppression and monopolization of power. Both Mansur and his father harassed the remaining members of the Hamdanid dynasty, in whose name they ostensibly ruled. On the diplomatic front, Mansur balanced ties with both the Byzantine Empire and the Fatimid Caliphate, and maintained the emirate's Shia Muslim orientation.

Mansur fought off two attempts to reinstall Hamdanid rule in the city, critically aided each time by the powerful Banu Kilab tribe. In return, Mansur promised the Kilab half of the emirate's revenues, but reneged on the agreement. To rid himself of the Kilab, he set a trap for them by inviting hundreds of their tribesmen to a feast only to ambush them. The tribesmen were either killed or imprisoned in the Citadel of Aleppo between 1012 and 1014. By the latter year, one of the Kilabi chieftains, Salih ibn Mirdas, escaped and went to war with Mansur, who was captured. To gain his freedom, he agreed to release all Kilabi prisoners and accord Salih half of the emirate's revenues. He reneged on the latter stipulation, prompting a renewal of conflict with the Kilab, who effectively besieged Aleppo. In 1016, Mansur's citadel commander, Fath al-Qal'i, rebelled in collaboration with Salih and forced Mansur to flee Aleppo. The Byzantine emperor Basil II gave Mansur asylum in Antioch and a fief near the Byzantine–Arab frontier. Afterward, Mansur became a commander of a Byzantine army unit and was in the entourage of Emperor Romanos III during the Battle of Azaz against Salih's son and successor, Shibl al-Dawla Nasr, in 1030.

== Early life and career ==
Mansur was the son of Lu'lu' al-Kabir, a former ghulām (slave soldier; pl. ghilmān) of the Hamdanid emirs of Aleppo who became ḥājib (chamberlain) under Emir Sa'd al-Dawla (r. 967–991). Though Sa'd was officially succeeded by his son Sa'id al-Dawla, power was effectively held by Lu'lu' al-Kabir. When Sa'id al-Dawla died in January 1002, Lu'lu' ruled Aleppo in the name of Sa'id al-Dawla's young sons Abu al-Hasan Ali and Abu al-Ma'ali Sharif until ousting them shortly afterward and declaring himself a ruler in his own right. Mansur ruled as his father's deputy and partner. Both Mansur and Lu'lu' harassed the remaining members of the Hamdanid dynasty in Aleppo, prompting one of them, Abu al-Hayja', to flee the city for Byzantine territory where he received official protection. At one point Mansur was made governor of Raqqa, which was taken from him by the Numayrid emir Waththab ibn Sabiq in 1007.

== Emir of Aleppo ==
=== Conflict with the Hamdanids ===
Lu'lu' al-Kabir died in 1008 and was succeeded by Mansur. Mansur attempted to concentrate further power into his hands at the expense of the Aleppine aʿyān (local elite), though he formally continued his predecessors' policy of separating the Emirate of Aleppo's civil administration from its military command. On the diplomatic front, he maintained the Byzantines' virtual protectorate over Aleppo, though he also developed contacts with the Cairo-based Fatimid Caliphate. Basing his information on the chronicles of medieval Aleppine historians, historian Suhayl Zakkar wrote,

Unlike his father, Mansur was over-confident, short-sighted, a drunkard, '[an] oppressor and unjust'. Because of this the Aleppines hated him and several of their poets cursed him in their poems. ... The population of Aleppo ... began to search for a way to get rid of him. As time went by he was heedlessly and arrogantly increasing his oppression. ... the Aleppines found that the restoration of the Hamdanid dynasty would be the solution. They recalled and emphasized the fact that Mansur himself was the son of [the] Hamdanids' slave who had betrayed his masters and who had usurped their rights.

With Mansur's rule lacking any strong foundation, his opponents among Aleppine factions or individuals, unnamed in sources, resolved to move against him and install Abu'l-Hayja' to the emirate. They gained the support of the Banu Kilab tribe, one of the most powerful elements in the emirate, and then appealed for the assistance of the Marwanid ruler of Diyar Bakr, Mumahhid al-Dawla; the latter was Abu'l-Hayja's father-in-law. Mumahhid al-Dawla secured Byzantine Emperor Basil II's permission for Abu'l-Hayja' to leave Byzantine territory and depose Mansur, provided that Mumahhid bear the financial expense of such an endeavor. Indeed, Mumahhid supplied Abu'l-Hayja' with money and 200 horsemen, and the Hamdanid was further promised the critical support of the Kilabi chieftains, whom he met on his way to Aleppo. However, once Mansur caught wind of the Kilab's backing for Abu'l-Hayja', he wrote to the tribe's chieftains, promising them a share of the Emirate of Aleppo's revenues and control of some of its rural areas in return for withdrawing their support for the Hamdanid. Moreover, Mansur appealed for military aid from Fatimid Caliph al-Hakim; Mansur promised to allow a Fatimid appointed governor to control the Citadel of Aleppo in return for such aid, which came in the form of Fatimid troops from Tripoli.

By the time Mansur's Fatimid reinforcements arrived in Aleppo, Abu'l-Hayja' and the Kilab had reached the city's outskirts. The Fatimid troops marched toward Abu'l-Hayja's camp, after which the Kilab, having secretly agreed to Mansur's offer, abandoned Abu'l-Hayja'. The latter then fled back to Byzantine territory. Basil II at first refused to once again grant asylum to the Hamdanid, but Mansur persuaded him to keep Abu'l-Hayja' under virtual house arrest in the Byzantine capital, Constantinople. Meanwhile, Mansur did not abide by his promise to al-Hakim, who responded by sending an army from Cairo with the aim of replacing Mansur with the Hamdanid emir Abu al-Ma'ali Sharif. This army made it to Ma'arrat al-Nu'man, in Aleppo's countryside, in 1011, but retreated after encountering resistance by the Kilab, who attempted to kidnap Abu al-Ma'ali Sharif and sell him to Mansur.

=== Subjugation of the Kilab ===
Mansur avoided giving the Kilab their promised share of the emirate, and when the Kilabi chieftains demanded Mansur abide by their secret agreement, Mansur procrastinated or used diplomatic means to stave off the tribesmen. According to Zakkar, the Kilab "neither understood nor trusted diplomacy. When Mansur paid nothing to the Kilabis they began to take." Accordingly, the tribesmen set up their encampments immediately outside of Aleppo and applied pressure against Mansur by grazing their flocks in the city's gardens, orchards and grain fields. They cut down olive trees and paralysed life in the city. Not strong enough to check the Kilab, Mansur engineered a ploy to rid himself of them. He pretended to accept Kilabi demands and enter a permanent settlement with the tribe. To feign good faith, he held a feast at his palace in Aleppo on 27 May 1012, hosting between 700 and 1,000 Kilabi tribesmen, including many prominent chieftains. The invitation was a ruse, and upon their arrival to the palace, the tribesmen were surrounded and ambushed by Mansur and his ghilmān.

Those Kilabi tribesmen who were not massacred were thrown into the dungeons of Aleppo's citadel. To gain their freedom, Muqallid ibn Za'ida, a Kilabi chieftain who did not attend the banquet, rallied his tribal forces and placed pressure on Mansur by besieging Kafartab, south of Aleppo. Mansur subsequently decided to show good faith by moving the Kilabi prisoners to better facilities and giving particularly favourable treatment to Muqallid's brothers, Jami' and Hamid. However, Mansur shortly after rescinded these good faith measures following Muqallid's death at Kafartab and the dispersal of his tribesmen. Mansur executed several Kilabi chieftains in captivity, and tortured others, while many died from the poor conditions they were kept in. The contemporary Aleppine historian, Yahya al-Antaki, wrote that Mansur managed to induce some Kilabi chieftains to accept his terms, and released a small group of tribesmen in 1013.

=== Relations with the Fatimids ===
During his father's lifetime, Mansur developed good relations with Caliph al-Hakim. As early as 1007, he sent his two sons to Cairo, where al-Hakim granted them a large amount of money and seven villages in Palestine. Moreover, al-Hakim bestowed on Mansur the title of murtaḍā ad-dawla ('approved of the Dynasty' or 'content of the State'). Though relations deteriorated in 1011, by 1014 Mansur resumed friendly ties with al-Hakim. In March 1014, al-Hakim sent Mansur a diploma recognizing Mansur's authority in Aleppo. Mansur was the first emir of Aleppo to accept the suzerainty, even if nominal, of the Fatimid Caliphate, as opposed to Mansur's predecessors, who nominally recognized the supremacy of the Abbasid Caliphate. It is not known when exactly Mansur paid formal allegiance to the Fatimids. Mansur maintained Aleppo's Shia Muslim orientation, in line with the Fatimids, and had the khuṭba (Friday prayer sermon) made in the name of al-Hakim.

=== Struggle with Salih ibn Mirdas ===
Among Mansur's Kilabi prisoners was Salih ibn Mirdas, the emir of al-Rahba. Mansur tortured and humiliated Salih in captivity and forced Salih to divorce his wife Tarud so that Mansur could wed her; Tarud was well known for her beauty, and according to historian Thierry Bianquis, was "the most beautiful woman of the age". According to Zakkar, it is not clear if Mansur did this solely to humiliate Salih and enjoy his wife, or to form a marital link with part of the Kilab. On 3 July 1014, Salih managed to escape the citadel and rejoin his tribesmen at Marj Dabiq, north of Aleppo. While contemporary Aleppine chronicles hold that Salih escaped through acrobatic means, Mansur later accused the governor of the citadel, Fath al-Qal'i, of collusion with Salih.

Salih quickly gained the allegiance of the entire body of Kilab, who were in awe of his escape, and moved against Aleppo. Mansur's ghilmān staved off Salih's forces at Aleppo's outskirts, encouraging Mansur to assemble a larger army composed of his ghilmān, craftsmen from the suq and men from Aleppo's lower-class neighbourhoods, including many Christians and Jews. On 13 August, Salih routed the Aleppine force, killing some 2,000 of Mansur's soldiers, and capturing Mansur and his senior commanders.

Two of Mansur's brothers escaped the Kilabi onslaught and returned to Aleppo, where they maintained order in the city with assistance from their mother. Salih attempted and failed to capture the city, and negotiations for Mansur's release were initiated between Salih and Mansur's representatives, mediated by Aleppine dignitaries. An agreement was soon reached which saw Mansur released in return for several overtures to Salih and the Kilab; among the overtures was the return of Salih's wife Tarud, a daughter of Mansur's for Salih to wed, the release of all Kilabi prisoners, a ransom of 50,000 gold dinars, recognition of Salih's authority over the Kilab, and the assignment of half of the Emirate of Aleppo's revenues to Salih. While Mansur fulfilled some parts of the agreement, he ultimately refused to give Salih his daughter and the promised share of Aleppo's revenues.

In retaliation against Mansur's reneging on their deal, Salih attacked Aleppo and prevented movement into and out of the city. This caused severe hardship for its inhabitants and Mansur was unable to challenge the Kilab alone. He thus appealed for support from Basil II, warning him that the Bedouin uprising was bound to harm the Byzantine Empire. Basil II agreed and dispatched 1,000 Armenian soldiers to assist Mansur, but they were soon after withdrawn when Salih convinced Basil II of Mansur's treachery and convinced the emperor of his own goodwill toward him. Basil II may have actually withdrawn his men to avoid antagonizing the Kilab or, more importantly, the Kilab's Numayrid kinsmen and allies, who posed a more immediate threat to Byzantine territory. In any case, Mansur's position was further weakened as a consequence.

=== Ouster ===
Zakkar asserts that Mansur's conflict with the Kilab ultimately led to his collapse, but the "fatal blow to Mansur's rule came when he disputed with his ghulām Fath al-Qal'i, the governor of Aleppo's citadel". Mansur pinned the blame for his troubles with the Kilab on Fath, whom he accused of conniving with Salih. Mansur did not have the power to forcibly remove Fath; instead, he attempted to set a trap against Fath, inviting the latter to meet him outside the citadel. Fath caught wind of Mansur's intrigues, locked the gates of the citadel and opened a rebellion against Mansur. On 7 January 1016, Fath recognized Salih's rule, an act which took Mansur by surprise. Having falsely believed that Fath handed over the citadel to Salih, Mansur fled Aleppo that night with his sons, brothers and a few of his ghilmān.

Disorder spread throughout Aleppo the morning after Mansur's flight. Aleppines looted Mansur's palace, taking some 80,000 gold dinars' worth of property. The medieval Aleppine chronicler Ibn al-Adim further noted that 28,000 volumes of manuscripts stored in the palace library were lost. A number of Christian and Jewish homes were also plundered. Though actual members of the Hamdanid dynasty had lost power by 1002, many contemporary Arabic chroniclers consider Mansur's ouster to represent the formal end of the Hamdanid emirate.

== Service with Byzantines ==
Mansur reached Byzantine-held Antioch two days after his flight, and Basil II ordered the catepan of that city to give him an honorable reception; providing refuge to former rulers of Aleppo was a common Byzantine practice because such ex-rulers could be used to pressure or threaten their successors. In his rush to escape Aleppo, Mansur left behind his mother, wives and daughters, who were detained by Fath, then transferred to Salih's custody. Salih then had Mansur's womenfolk safely returned to him in Antioch, with the exception of one of Mansur's daughters, whom Salih wed per his previous agreement with Mansur.

Basil II accorded Mansur the fief of Shih al-Laylun (Loulon) near the Byzantine–Arab frontier. According to historian Jean-Claude Cheynet, this fief could not have been the frontier fortress of Loulon, but rather a group of villages from which Mansur received his income during his asylum in Antioch. Mansur later built a fortress in his fief. Basil II also granted Mansur a building in Antioch itself. Mansur received a salary and he and his men served in the Byzantine army of Antioch, where he commanded a tagma (professional regiment) of 700 men. He was in the entourage of Emperor Romanos III at the Battle of Azaz in 1030, which was fought against Salih's son and successor, Shibl al-Dawla Nasr. Mansur's presence likely indicates Romanos's intention to restore Mansur to Aleppo, according to Zakkar, though the attempt ended in a decisive Byzantine defeat.

== Bibliography ==
- Amabe, Fukuzo (2016). Urban Autonomy in Medieval Islam: Damascus, Aleppo, Cordoba, Toledo, Valencia and Tunis. Leiden: Brill. ISBN 978-90-04-31026-1.
- Bianquis, Thierry (1993). "Mirdās". In Bosworth, C. E.; van Donzel, E.; Heinrichs, W. P. & Pellat, Ch. (eds.). The Encyclopaedia of Islam, Second Edition. Volume VII: Mif–Naz. Leiden: E. J. Brill. pp. 115–123. ISBN 978-90-04-09419-2.
- Canard, Marius (1971). "Ḥamdānids". In Lewis, B.; Ménage, V. L.; Pellat, Ch. & Schacht, J. (eds.). The Encyclopaedia of Islam, Second Edition. Volume III: H–Iram. Leiden: E. J. Brill. pp. 126–131. OCLC 495469525.
- Cheynet, Jean Claude (2006). "The Duchy of Antioch during the Second Period of Byzantine Rule". In Ciggaar, K.; Metcalf, M. (eds.). East and West in the Medieval Eastern Mediterranean I: Antioch from the Byzantine Reconquest until the End of the Crusader Principality. Leuven: Peeters Publishers. pp. 1–16. ISBN 90-429-1735-0.
- Cheynet, Jean Claude (2003). "Basil II and Asia Minor". In Magdalino, Paul (ed.). Byzantium in the Year 1000. Leiden: Brill. pp. 71–108. ISBN 90-04-12097-1.
- Rice, D. S. (1952). "Medieval Ḥarrān: Studies on Its Topography and Monuments, I". Anatolian Studies. 2. British Institute of Archaeology at Ankara: 36–84. doi:10.2307/3642366. JSTOR 3642366. S2CID 129270461.
- Zakkar, Suhayl (1971). The Emirate of Aleppo: 1004–1094. Aleppo: Dar al-Amanah.

Preceded by Lu'lu' al-Kabir	Emir of Aleppo; 1008 – January 1016	Succeeded by Fath al-Qal'i
