= Sa'id al-Dawla =

Emir of Aleppo
- Reign: 991–1002
- Predecessor: Sa'd al-Dawla
- Successor: Lu'lu' al-Kabir
- Died: January 1002; Aleppo, Hamdanid dynasty
Names
- Abu'l-Fada'il Sa'id al-Dawla
- Dynasty: Hamdanid
- Father: Sa'd al-Dawla
- Religion: Shia Islam

Abu'l-Fada'il Sa'id al-Dawla (Arabic: أبو الفضائل سعيد الدولة) was the third Hamdanid ruler of the Emirate of Aleppo. He succeeded his father Sa'd al-Dawla in 991, but throughout his reign real power rested in the hands of Sa'd al-Dawla's former chamberlain, Lu'lu', to whose daughter Sa'id was wed. His reign was dominated by the Fatimid Caliphate's repeated attempts to conquer Aleppo, which was prevented only by the intervention of the Byzantine Empire. Warfare lasted until 1000, when a peace treaty was concluded guaranteeing Aleppo's continued existence as a buffer state between the two powers. Finally, in January 1002 Sa'id al-Dawla died, possibly poisoned by Lu'lu', and Lu'lu' assumed control of Aleppo in his own name.

== Life and reign ==
Family tree of the Hamdanid dynasty

Sa'id al-Dawla's father, Sa'd al-Dawla, had only with difficulty managed to first secure a measure of control over his domains, and then to maintain a precarious autonomy by manoeuvring between the Byzantine Empire, the Fatimids of Egypt, and the Buyids in Iraq, alternating between warfare and recognizing the suzerainty of each power in turn. The once-proud emirate, which under Sa'id al-Dawla's grandfather Sayf al-Dawla included all of northern Syria and much of the Jazira, had now shrunk to the region around Aleppo. Sa'd al-Dawla's domestic position was precarious, and his state was impoverished and militarily impotent. After the Byzantine–Fatimid peace of 987/8, he came to depend once more on the Byzantines, and it was Byzantine troops that helped him defeat a Fatimid-sponsored attempt to seize Aleppo by the former Hamdanid governor Bakjur in April 991.

Following Sa'd al-Dawla's death in December 991, his young son Abu'l-Fada'il, known by the laqab of Sa'id al-Dawla (The Fortunate of the Rule/State) succeeded him as emir. Sa'id al-Dawla was under the influence of his chief minister and later father-in-law, Lu'lu', who continued to support the alliance with the Byzantines. Many of his rivals, resenting his power, defected upon Sa'd al-Dawla's death to the Fatimids, who now resumed their attacks on Aleppo. As Marius Canard writes, "the history of [Sa'id al-Dawla's] reign is almost exclusively that of the attempts of Fatimid Egypt to gain the emirate of Aleppo, which were opposed by the Byzantine emperor".

Encouraged by the Hamdanid defectors, the Fatimid caliph al-Aziz launched a first attack in 992, under the governor of Damascus, the Turkish general Manjutakin. The Fatimid general invaded the emirate, defeated a Byzantine force under the doux of Antioch, Michael Bourtzes, in June 992, and laid siege to Aleppo. He failed to pursue the siege with vigour, however, and the city was easily able to resist. In the spring of 993, after thirteen months of campaigning, Manjutakin was forced to return to Damascus due to lack of supplies. In spring 994, Manjutakin launched another invasion, again defeated Bourtzes at the Battle of the Orontes, took Homs, Apamea and Shayzar and besieged Aleppo for eleven months. The blockade was far more effective this time and soon caused a severe lack of food. Sa'id al-Dawla suggested surrendering to Manjutakin, but the determined stance of Lu'lu' allowed the city's defenders to hold out until the sudden arrival of the Byzantine emperor, Basil II, in Syria in April 995. Basil, who had been campaigning in Bulgaria, had responded to the Hamdanids' plea for aid, and crossed Asia Minor in only sixteen days at the head of an army 13,000 strong; his sudden arrival caused panic in the Fatimid army: Manjutakin burned his camp and retreated to Damascus without battle.

Sa'id al-Dawla and Lu'lu' prostrated themselves before the emperor in person as a sign of gratitude and submission, and he in turn released the emirate from its obligation to pay an annual tribute. Basil's interest in Syria was limited, however, and after a brief campaign that saw an unsuccessful attack on Tripoli, returned to Constantinople. Al-Aziz on the other hand now prepared for all-out war with the Byzantines, but his preparations were cut short by his death in October 996. Nevertheless, the Byzantine–Fatimid contest over Syria continued, with alternating success. In 995, Lu'lu' made terms with al-Aziz and acknowledged him as Caliph, and for a few years Fatimid influence over Aleppo grew. In 998 Lu'lu' and Sa'id al-Dawla tried to seize the fortress of Apamea, but were thwarted by the new Byzantine doux, Damian Dalassenos. Dalassenos' defeat and death in a battle with the Fatimids shortly after caused another intervention by Basil in the next year, which stabilized the situation and strengthened Aleppo's security from Fatimid attack by placing a Byzantine garrison at Shayzar. The conflict ended with another treaty in 1001 and the conclusion of a ten-year truce.

In January 1002, Sa'id al-Dawla died. According to a tradition recorded by Ibn al-Adim, he was poisoned by one of his concubines at the behest of Lu'lu'. Along with his son Mansur, Lu'lu' now assumed direct power, at first as ostensible guardians over Sa'id al-Dawla's sons Abu'l-Hasan Ali and Abu'l-Ma'ali Sharif, until, in 1003/4, he had them exiled to Egypt. At the same time, one of Sa'id al-Dawla's brothers, Abu'l-Hayja, fled, disguised as a woman, to the Byzantine court. Lu'lu' was a capable ruler who maintained the balance between Byzantium and the Fatimids, but after his death in 1008/9 Aleppo gravitated increasingly towards the latter. A Hamdanid restoration attempt, led by Abu'l-Hayja, failed, and in 1015/6 Mansur ibn Lu'lu' was in turn deposed, ending the last vestiges of Hamdanid rule in Aleppo.

== Sources ==
- Canard, Marius (1971). "Ḥamdānids". In Lewis, B.; Ménage, V. L.; Pellat, Ch. & Schacht, J. (eds.). The Encyclopaedia of Islam, Second Edition. Volume III: H–Iram. Leiden: E. J. Brill. pp. 126–131. OCLC 495469525.
- Canard, Marius (1986). "Luʾluʾ". In Bosworth, C. E.; van Donzel, E.; Lewis, B. & Pellat, Ch. (eds.). The Encyclopaedia of Islam, Second Edition. Volume V: Khe–Mahi. Leiden: E. J. Brill. p. 820. ISBN 978-90-04-07819-2.
- Kennedy, Hugh (2004) [1986]. The Prophet and the Age of the Caliphates: The Islamic Near East from the 6th to the 11th Century (Second ed.). Harlow: Longman. ISBN 978-0-582-40525-7.
- Stevenson, William B. (1926). "Chapter VI. Islam in Syria and Egypt (750–1100)". In Bury, John Bagnell (ed.). The Cambridge Medieval History, Volume V: Contest of Empire and Papacy. New York: The Macmillan Company. pp. 242–264.
- Whittow, Mark (1996). The Making of Byzantium, 600–1025. Berkeley and Los Angeles, California: University of California Press. ISBN 978-0-520-20496-6.

Preceded by Sa'd al-Dawla	Emir of Aleppo; 991–1002	Succeeded by Lu'lu' al-Kabir
