= 977 =

Calendar year

977 in various calendars
Gregorian calendar	977; CMLXXVII
Ab urbe condita	1730
Armenian calendar	426; ԹՎ ՆԻԶ
Assyrian calendar	5727
Balinese saka calendar	898–899
Bengali calendar	383–384
Berber calendar	1927
Buddhist calendar	1521
Burmese calendar	339
Byzantine calendar	6485–6486
Chinese calendar	丙子年 (Fire Rat); 3674 or 3467 — to — 丁丑年 (Fire Ox); 3675 or 3468
Coptic calendar	693–694
Discordian calendar	2143
Ethiopian calendar	969–970
Hebrew calendar	4737–4738
- Hindu calendars
Vikram Samvat	1033–1034
Shaka Samvat	898–899
Kali Yuga	4077–4078
Holocene calendar	10977
Iranian calendar	355–356
Islamic calendar	366–367
Japanese calendar	Jōgen 2 (貞元２年)
Javanese calendar	878–879
Julian calendar	977; CMLXXVII
Korean calendar	3310
Minguo calendar	935 before ROC 民前935年
Nanakshahi calendar	−491
Seleucid era	1288/1289 AG
Thai solar calendar	1519–1520
Tibetan calendar	མེ་ཕོ་བྱི་བ་ལོ་ (male Fire-Rat); 1103 or 722 or −50 — to — མེ་མོ་གླང་ལོ་ (female Fire-Ox); 1104 or 723 or −49

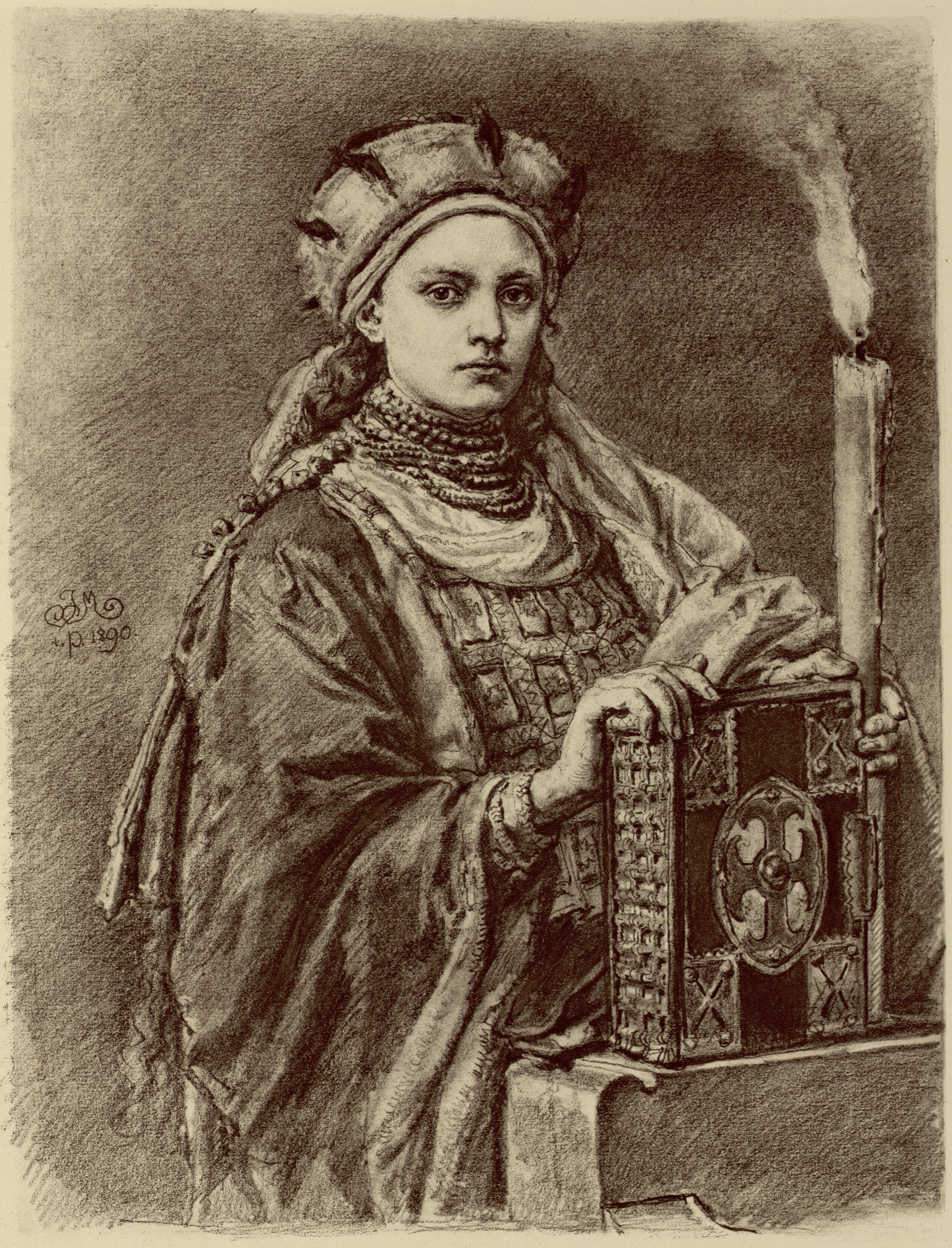
Dobrawa of Bohemia (ca. 940/45–977)

Year 977 (CMLXXVII) was a common year starting on Monday of the Julian calendar.

== Events ==
=== By place ===
==== Europe ====
- May – Boris II, dethroned emperor (tsar) of Bulgaria, and his brother Roman manage to escape from captivity in Constantinople. They reach the Bulgarian border, but Boris is killed by mistake by the border guards. Roman is crowned as new ruler, although leadership and the control of the army remain in the hands of General Samuel (a member of the Cometopuli Dynasty).
- War of the Three Henries: Henry III (the Younger), duke of Carinthia, gets involved in a conflict over the Patriarchate of Aquileia (March of Verona) in northeastern Italy. Emperor Otto II (the Red) decides in Aquileia's favor, prompting Henry III to go into revolt. He joins forces with Henry II (the Wrangler), duke of Bavaria. They are both joined by Henry I, bishop of Augsburg.
- August – Otto II appoints his cousin Charles, illegitimate son of the late King Louis IV (d'Outremer), as duke of Lorraine. King Lothair III – who claims the duchy as his own territory – declares war to the Holy Roman Empire. He leads an expedition into Lorraine accompanied by Hugh Capet. Lothair crosses the Meuse River and takes Aachen, sacking the imperial palace.
- Fall – Otto II invades the West Frankish Kingdom accompanied by Charles and ravages the cities of Reims, Soissons (where he halts at the Abbey of Saint Médard for devotions) and Laon. Lothair III escapes and flees to Paris, where he is besieged by imperial forces. Charles is proclaimed 'King of the Franks' by Dietrich I, bishop of Metz, at Laon.
- November 30 – Otto II is unable to take Paris, he lifts the siege of the capital and withdraws. A Frankish army under Lothair III pursues and defeats the imperial rearguard while crossing the Aisne River. Otto escapes and is forced to take refuge at Aachen with Charles, after his supplies are destroyed.

==== Scotland ====
- King Kenneth II of Scotland kills his rival Amlaíb mac Illuilb (or Amlaíb), brother of the late King Cuilén, to establish himself as Cuilén's successor.

==== Arabian Empire ====
- Spring – Sabuktigin, a Samanid general, succeeds his father-in-law Alp-Tegin as governor of Ghazna (modern Afghanistan). He enlarges his dominions and founds the Ghaznavid Dynasty.
- Summer – 'Adud al-Dawla, ruler (shah) of the Buyid Dynasty, drives the Hamdanids out of Mosul and tries to unify the country. Abu Taghlib is forced to flee to the Byzantine city of Antzitene.
- Emir Sa'd al-Dawla recovers his capital, Aleppo, from the ghulam Bakjur, who receives the governorship of Homs as compensation.

=== By topic ===
==== Religion ====
- Æthelwold, bishop of Winchester, rebuilds the western end of the Old Minster, with twin towers and no apses (approximate date).
- The Imam Ali Mosque, located in Najaf (modern Iraq), is completed by 'Adud al-Dawla.

== Births ==
- March 4 – Al-Musabbihi, Fatimid historian (d. 1030)
- Fujiwara no Teishi, Japanese empress consort (d. 1001)
- Kōkei, Japanese Buddhist monk (approximate date)
- Poppo, abbot of Stavelot-Malmedy (d. 1048)

== Deaths ==
- March 1 – Rudesind, Galician bishop (b. 907)
- November 8 – Ibn al-Qūṭiyya, Andalusian historian
- December 20 – Fujiwara no Kanemichi, Japanese statesman (b. 925)
- Amlaíb mac Illuilb, king of Alba (Scotland)
- Ashot III (the Merciful), king of Armenia
- Bisutun, ruler of the Ziyarid Dynasty
- Boris II, emperor of the Bulgarian Empire
- Dobrawa, duchess consort of the Polans
- Gisulf I, prince of Salerno (approximate date)
- Guo Zhongshu, Chinese painter and calligrapher
- Ivar of Limerick, Norse Viking king
- Kamo no Yasunori, Japanese spiritual advisor (b. 917)
- Oleg, prince of the Drevlyans
- Peter, Byzantine eunuch general
- Sideman, bishop of Crediton
