= List of monarchs of Aleppo =

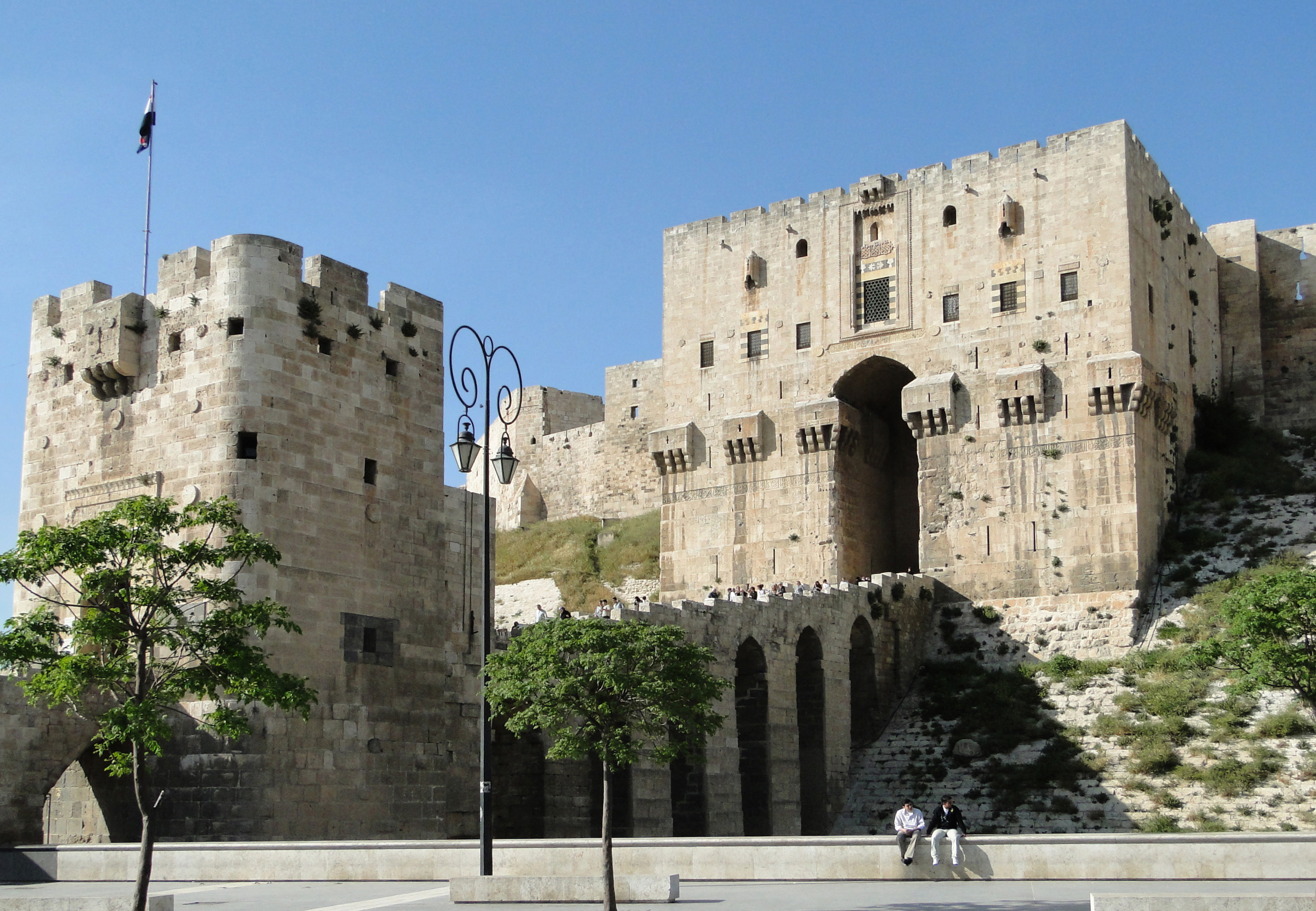
Aleppo Citadel was the center of the Aleppan monarchs in the Middle Ages

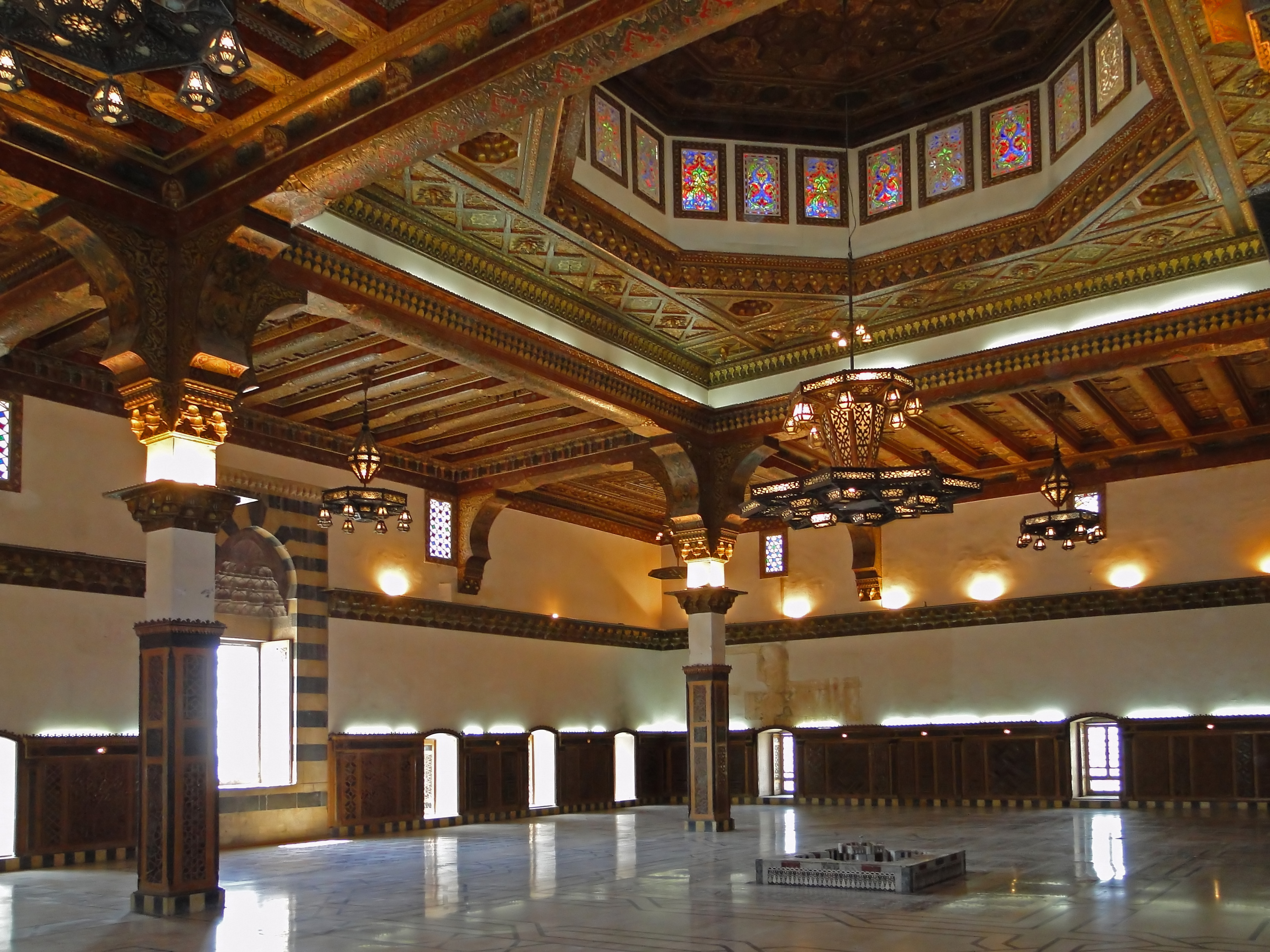
Aleppo Citadel Throne Hall, built by the Mamluk Sultan of Aleppo Sayf al-Din Jakam

The monarchs of Aleppo reigned as kings, emirs and sultans of the city and its surrounding region since the later half of the 3rd millennium BC, starting with the kings of Armi, followed by the Amorite dynasty of Yamhad. Muslim rule of the city ended with the Ayyubid dynasty which was ousted by the Mongol conquest in 1260.

The rulers of Yamhad used the titles of king and Great King, while the Hittite dynasty monarchs used the titles of king and viceroy.

The Emirate of Halab was established in 945 by the Hamdanid dynasty and lasted until 1086, when it became a sultanate under the Seljuq dynasty. The sultanate was sometimes ruled together with Damascus under the same sultan.

The Artuqids rulers used the titles of Malik and emir, as did the Zengid rulers which added the title atabeg. The Ayyubid monarchs used the titles of sultan and malik.

The dates for Yamhad and the Hittite Dynasties are proximate and calculated by the Middle chronology.

== Yamhad Kings ==
Yamhad was the name of the Amorite kingdom centered at Ḥalab (modern day Aleppo), its dynasty ruled for more than two centuries, Aleppo became a major power and dominated Northern Syria with the monarch holding the title of Great King.

Portrait	Name	King From	King Until	Relationship with Predecessor(s)	Title
	Sumu-Epuh	c. 1810 BC	c. 1780 BC		King of Yamhad (Halab)
	Yarim-Lim I	c. 1780 BC	c. 1764 BC	Son of Sumu-Epuh	Great King of Yamhad (Halab)
	Hammurabi I	c. 1764 BC	c. 1750 BC	Son of Yarim-Lim I	Great King of Yamhad (Halab)
	Abba-El I	c. 1750 BC	c. 1720 BC	Son of Hammurabi I	Great King of Yamhad (Halab)
	Yarim-Lim II	c. 1720 BC	c. 1700 BC	Son of Abba-El I	Great King of Yamhad (Halab)
	Niqmi-Epuh	c. 1700 BC	c. 1675 BC	Son of Yarim-Lim II	Great King of Yamhad (Halab)
	Irkabtum	c. 1675 BC	Middle 17th century BC	Son of Niqmi-Epuh	Great King of Yamhad (Halab)
	Hammurabi II	Middle 17th century BC	Middle 17th century BC		Great King of Yamhad (Halab)
	Yarim-Lim III	Middle 17th century BC	c. 1625 BC	Probably Son of Niqmi-Epuh	Great King of Yamhad (Halab)
	Hammurabi III	c. 1625 BC	c. 1600 BC	Son of Yarim-Lim III	King of Yamhad (Halab)

During these centuries, Aleppo had to deal with the rising power of both the Mitanni (Hurrian), and the Hittite kingdoms.

The Hurrians's influence seems clear already during the reign of Abba-El I (Abban) (1750-1720 BC); he recalls the help given to him by the Hurrian Goddess Hebat.

Then Aleppo and its allies were attacked by the Hittite king Hattusili I starting c. 1650 BC (Middle chronology). After many campaigns, Hattusili I finally attacked Aleppo directly during the reign of Hammurabi III. The attack ended in a defeat, the wounding of the Hittite king and his later death c. 1620 BC.

Yet later Aleppo was conquered by Hattusili's son Mursili I, who captured Hammurabi III.

The native dynasty regained Halab after the assassination of Mursili but the "Yamhad" name fell out of use.

According to Jesse Casana (2009):

Under Hattusili’s successor, Mursili I, the Hittites conquered much of Syria, including Halab, and invaded Mesopotamia where they sacked Babylon. These incursions probably weakened the kingdom of Yamhad considerably but did not lead to full Hittite control of the region. Instead, Hittite advances into northern Syria were countered by the Hurrian kingdom of Mittani to the east, as well as by the Egyptians to the south. During the period between the writing of the Alalakh Level VII [1780-1680 BC] and Level IV texts, Halab seems to have become subservient to Mittani while still exerting control over the Amuq region.

Portrait	Name	King From	King Until	Relationship with Predecessor(s)	Title
	Sarra-El	Early 16th century BC	Middle 16th century BC	Probably Son of Yarim-Lim III	King of Halab
	Abba-El II	Middle 16th century BC	Middle 16th century BC	Son of Sarra-El	King of Halab
	Ilim-Ilimma I	Middle 16th century BC	c. 1525 BC	Son of Abba-El II	King of Halab

== Mitanni and Hittite conquests ==
Parshatatar (Baratarna) of Mitanni (1510-1490 BC) conquered Aleppo and surrounding areas, and the city became part of that kingdom.

Information about this period is found in the biography of Idrimi of Alalakh, who also became the ruler of Aleppo. Idrimi became a vassal of Barattarna. At that time, this was known as the kingdom of Mukish.

The city was conquered by Suppiluliuma I of the Hittites in the 14th century BC. Suppiluliuma installed his son Telipinus as king of Aleppo. Not all the kings of this dynasty are known. The Hittite dynasty remained in power until the Late Bronze Age collapse.

Portrait	Name	King From	King Until	Relationship with Predecessor(s)	Title
	Telepinus	Later Half of the 14th century BC		Son of the Hittite king Suppiluliuma I	King of Halab
	Talmi-Sarruma	c. 1300 BC		Son of Telepinus	King of Halab
	Halpazitis		c. 1220 BC		King of Halab

After the end of the Hittites, Arameans tribes began to settle in the region, Aleppo became part of the Syro-Hittite state of Palistin, then its successor Bit Agusi centered at Arpad, Afterwards, it was sequentially part of Assyria, Chaldea, Achaemenid Persia, Macedonia, Seleúkeia, Armenia, Roman, Byzantine, and Sasanid Persian, empires, the Rashidun, Umayyad, and the Abbasid Caliphate.

== Hamdanid emirs ==
The Hamdanids were an Arab dynasty, established in 945 by Sayf al-Dawla, third of the dynasty. They ruled most of Syria under the titular authority of the Abbasid Caliph with Aleppo as their capital, displacing the Ikhshids.

Portrait	Epithet	Name	Emir From	Emir Until	Relationship with Predecessor(s)	Title
	Sayf al-Dawla	Ali ibn Abu'l-Hayja 'Abdallah (Ali I)	945	967	Dynasty established	Emir of Halab
Aleppo Citadel	Sa'd al-Dawla	Sharif ibn Ali (Sharif I)	967	969	Son of Sayf al-Dawla	Emir of Halab

=== Non-dynastic ===
Qarghuyah, the chamberlain of Sayf al-Dawla, ousted Sa'd al-Dawla and assumed control over the city. Sa'd al-Dawla was able to regain Aleppo in 977.

Portrait	Epithet	Name	Emir From	Emir Until	Relationship with Predecessor(s)	Title
		Qarghuyah	969	975	chamberlain of Sayf al-Dawla	Emir of Halab
		Bakjur	975	977	Deputy of Qarghuyah	Emir of Halab

=== Restoration of Ḥamdāni Emirs ===
Portrait	Epithet	Name	Emir From	Emir Until	Relationship with Predecessor(s)	Title
	Sa'd al-Dawla	Sharif ibn Ali (Sharif I)	977	991	Son of Sayf al-Dawla	Emir of Halab
	Sa'id al-Dawla	Sa'id ibn Sharif (Sa'id)	991	1002	Son of Sa'd al-Dawla	Emir of Halab
		Abu'l-Hasan Ali (Ali II)	1002	1004	Sons of Sa'id al-Dawla	Emir of Halab
		Abu'l-Ma'ali Sharif (Sharif II)	1004	1004	Sons of Sa'id al-Dawla	Emir of Halab

== Lu'lu' emirs ==
Lu'lu' al-Kabir was a slave and then chamberlain of Sa'd al-Dawla. He married his daughter to Sa'id al-Dawla, and after the latter's death, he assumed direct power over Aleppo. At first, he served as guardians to Sa'id al-Dawla's sons Abu'l-Hasan Ali and Abu'l-Ma'ali Sharif. In 1004, he had them exiled to Egypt and assumed full control of the city.

Portrait	Epithet	Name	Emir From	Emir Until	Relationship with Predecessor(s)	Title
	Lu'lu' al-Kabir	Abu Muhammad Lu'lu' al-Sayfi (Lu'lu')	1004	1009	Father in law of Sa'id al-Dawla Guardian of Abu'l-Ma'ali Sharif	Emir of Halab
	Murtada al-Dawla	Abu Nasr Mansur (Mansur)	1009	1016	Son of Lu'lu' al-kabir	Emir of Halab

=== Non-dynastic ===
In 1016, a rebellion broke out in the city and Fath al-Qal'i, custodian of the Citadel of Aleppo, opened the doors for the rebels causing Mansur to flee. Fath al-Qal'i accepted the authority of the Fatimid Caliph and, after a brief rule, ceded Aleppo to the caliph in return for the treasury and the rule of Tyre.

Portrait	Epithet	Name	Emir From	Emir Until	Relationship with Predecessor(s)	Title
	Mubarak al-Dawla	Abu Nasr Fath al-Qal'i (Fateh)	1016	1016		Emir of Halab

== Fatimid emirs ==
Al-Hakim appointed Aziz al-Dawla as the first Fatimid governor of Aleppo, but in 1020, Aziz declared his independence, and ruled for two years before being assassinated by a Fatimid agent.

Portrait	Epithet	Name	Emir From	Emir Until	Relationship with Predecessor(s)	Title
	Aziz al-Dawla	Abu Shuja' Fatik	October 1016	6 July 1022	No relationship with previous ruler	Emir of Halab
	Wafiyy al-Dawla	Abu'l Najm Badr	July 1022	October 1022	Ghulam (slave soldier) of Aziz al-Dawla	Emir of Halab
	Safiyy al-Dawla	Muhammad ibn Ali ibn Ja'far ibn Fallah	10 October 1022	10 April 1023		Emir of Halab
	Sanad al-Dawla	Al-Hasan ibn Muhammad ibn Thu'ban	10 April 1023	2 July 1024		Emir of Halab
	Sadid al-Mulk	Thu'ban ibn Muhammad ibn Thu'ban	27 July 1024	18 January 1025	Brother of Sanad al-Dawla	Emir of Halab

== Mirdasid emirs ==
The Mirdasids conquered Aleppo in 1024 and kept their autonomy through political maneuvers, allying themselves with the Byzantines at times and the Fatimid at others.

Portrait	Epithet	Name	Emir From	Emir Until	Relationship with Predecessor(s)	Notes	Title
	Asad al-Dawla	Salih ibn Mirdas (Salih)	1025	1029	No relationship with previous ruler		Emir of Halab
	Mu'izz al-Dawla	Thimal	1029	1030	Son of Asad al-Dawla Salih	First Reign	Emir of Halab
	Shibl al-Dawla	Nasr (Nasr I)	1029	1038	Eldest son of Asad al-Dawla Salih	Second Reign	Emir of Halab
	Mu'izz al-Dawla	Thimal	1038	1038	Son of Asad al-Dawla Salih	Second Reign	Emir of Halab

After the death of Salih, his sons Nasr and Thimal ruled together. In 1030, Nasr deposed Thimal and ruled solely until killed by Anushtakin al-Dizbari, the Fatimid governor of Damascus. Thimal regained Aleppo briefly in 1038 when the Fatimid army retook the city, returning it to Fatimid rule.

=== Non-dynastic ===
In December 1041 Anushtakin al-Dizbari fell out of favor with Cairo and declared his independence in Aleppo. He died of illness in 1042 and Thimal returned to power.

Portrait	Epithet	Name	Emir From	Emir Until	Relationship with Predecessor(s)	Notes	Title
	Sharaf al-Ma'ali	Anushtakin al-Dizbari	1038	1042			Emir of Halab

=== Mirdasid Dynasty ===
Thimal regained Aleppo and accepted the authority of the Fatimid Caliph.

Portrait	Epithet	Name	Emir From	Emir Until	Relationship with Predecessor(s)	Notes	Title
	Mu'izz al-Dawla	Thimal	1042	1057	Son of Asad al-Dawla Salih	Third Reign	Emir of Halab

=== Non-dynastic ===
In 1057, fearing family intrigues, Thimal handed over Aleppo to the Fatimids in return for Acre, Byblos and Beirut, thus returning Aleppo to direct Fatimid control.

Portrait	Epithet	Name	Emir From	Emir Until	Relationship with Predecessor(s)	Notes	Title
	Makin al-Dawla	Al-Ḥasan ibn ʿAlī ibn Mulhim al-Uqayli	1057	1060			Emir of Halab

=== Mirdasid dynasty ===
In 1060, Thimal's nephew, Rashid al-Dawla Mahmud, the son of Shibl al-Dawla Nasr, briefly regained Aleppo, losing after a few months to the Fatimids.

Portrait	Epithet	Name	Emir From	Emir Until	Relationship with Predecessor(s)	Notes	Title
	Rashid al-Dawla	Mahmud (Mahmud I)	1060	1060	• Son of Shibl al-Dawla Nasr	First Reign	Emir of Halab

About three weeks later on 30 August 1060 Asad al-Dawla 'Atiyya son of Salih the founder of the dynasty occupied Aleppo for a day and a half then fled as Mu'izz al-Dawla Mahmud advanced on the city after defeating the Fatimid army.

Portrait	Epithet	Name	Emir From	Emir Until	Relationship with Predecessor(s)	Notes	Title
	Asad al-Dawla	'Atiyya	1060	1060	Son of Asad al-Dawla Salih	First Reign	Emir of Halab
	Rashid al-Dawla	Mahmud (Mahmud I)	1060	1061	Son of Shibl al-Dawla Nasr	Second Reign	Emir of Halab
	Mu'izz al-Dawla	Thimal	1061	1062	Sons of Asad al-Dawla Salih	Fourth Reign	Emir of Halab
	Asad al-Dawla	'Atiyya	1062	1065	Sons of Asad al-Dawla Salih	Second Reign	Emir of Halab
	Mu'izz al-Dawla	Mahmud (Mahmud I)	1065	1075	Son of Shibl al-Dawla Nasr	Third Reign	Emir of Halab
	Jalal al-Dawla	Nasr (Nasr II)	1075	1076	Sons of Rashid al-Dawla Mahmud		Emir of Halab
		Sabiq ibn Mahmud (Sabiq)	1076	1080	Sons of Rashid al-Dawla Mahmud		Emir of Halab

== Uqaylid emirs ==
The pressure of Tutush I led the people of Aleppo along with the Mirdasid Emir to offer the city keys to Sharaf al-Dawla Muslim the ruler of Mosul, the Mirdasid family members were compensated by various towns in Syria.

Portrait	Epithet	Name	Emir From	Emir Until	Relationship with Predecessor(s)	Title
	Sharaf al-Dawla	Muslim ibn Quraysh (Muslim)	1080	1085		Emir of Halab
		Hassan ibn Hibat Allah Al-Hutayti	1085	1086	Brother of Sharaf al-Dawla	Emir of Halab

Sharaf al-Dawla was killed in June 1085 and was succeeded by his brother Ibrahim ibn Quraysh in Mosul, while Aleppo was managed by the Sharif Hassan ibn Hibat Allah Al-Hutayti.

== Seljuk sultans ==
Hassan ibn Hibat Allah Al-Hutayti promised to surrender the city to Tutush but then refused and wrote to Sultan Malik-Shah I offering to surrender the city to him, Tutush attacked and occupied the city except for the citadel in May 1086, he stayed until October and left for Damascus due to the advance of Malik-Shah armies, the Sultan himself arrived in December 1086.

Portrait	Epithet	Name	Sultan From	Sultan Until	Relationship with Predecessor(s)	Notes	Title
	Taj al-Dawla	Tutush	1086	1086		First Reign	Sultan of Halab
	Mu'izz al-Dunia wa al-Din	Malik-Shah	1086	1092	Brother of Tutush		Sultan of Halab

After the death of Malik-Shah I, his governor Aq Sunqur al-Hajib enjoyed much autonomy. He pledged allegiance to Malik-Shah's son Mahmud I, and then to Tutush only to switch back to Mahmud's brother Barkiyaruq. In 1094, Tutush defeated and beheaded Aq Sunqur thus assuming full control over Aleppo.

Portrait	Epithet	Name	Sultan From	Sultan Until	Relationship with Predecessor(s)	Notes	Title
	Nasir al-Din	Mahmud (Mahmud II)	1092	1093	Son of Malik-Shah		Sultan of Halab
	Taj al-Dawla	Tutush	1093	1093	Brother of Malik-Shah	Second Reign	Sultan of Halab
	Rukn al-Din	Barkiyaruq	1093	1094	Son of Malik-Shah		Sultan of Halab
	Taj al-Dawla	Tutush	1094	1095	Brother of Malik-Shah	Third Reign	Sultan of Halab
	Fakhr al-Mulk	Radwan	1095	1113	Son of Tutush		Sultan of Halab
	Shams al-Mulk	Alp Arslan	1113	1114	Sons of Radwan	Under the regency of Lu'lu' al-Yaya	Sultan of Halab
		Sultan Shah	1114	1118	Sons of Radwan	Under the regency of Lu'lu' al-Yaya	Sultan of Halab

== Artuqid emirs ==
Sultan Shah was only six when he came to the throne, the threats of the Crusader Count Joscelin led Sultan Shah Guardian Ibn al-Khashshab to offer the city to Ilghazi of Mardin who came to Aleppo thus starting the Artuqid dynasty in Aleppo.

Portrait	Epithet	Name	Emir From	Emir Until	Relationship with Predecessor(s)	Notes	Title
	Najm al-Din	Ilghazi	1118	1120	Son in Law of Radwan	First Reign	Emir of Halab
	Shams al-Dawla	Suleiman I	1120	1120	Son of Ilghazi	Usurper	Emir of Halab
	Najm al-Din	Ilghazi	1120	1122	Son in Law of Radwan	Second Reign	Emir of Halab
	Badr al-Dawla	Suleiman II	1122	1123	Nephews of Ilghazi	First Reign	Emir of Halab
	Nour al-Dawla	Balak	1123	1124	Nephews of Ilghazi		Emir of Halab
	Husam al-Din	Timurtash	1124	1125	Son of Ilghazi		Emir of Halab

Timurtash was occupied with taking over the cities of his recently deceased brother Suleiman I (who usurped the emir of Aleppo briefly in 1120), the crusaders attacked Aleppo but Timurtash refused to come back, this led the people of Aleppo to seek the help of Aqsunqur al-Bursuqi the Seljuq atabeg of Mosul, Aqsunqur broke the crusader siege adding Aleppo to the domains of Seljuq sultan Mahmud II.

In 1127 The city rebelled against the Seljuq governor Khatlagh Abah and restored Suleiman II.

Portrait	Epithet	Name	Emir From	Emir Until	Relationship with Predecessor(s)	Notes	Title
	Badr al-Dawla	Suleiman II	1127	1128	Nephew of Ilghazi	Second Reign	Emir of Halab

== Zengid emirs ==
Imad ad-Din Zengi, the new atabeg of Mosul, sent his army to end the troubles and appointed Turkish general Sawar ibn Aytegin as governor. They ruled in the name of Seljuq Sultan Mahmud II whose death had led to civil war. Zengi didn't declare his independence and stood by Ghiyath ad-Din Mas'ud. the Seljuq Sultan of Iraq, ruling in his name. However, the sultan decided to eliminate Zengi and called upon him to show in his presence. Zengi was warned and declined to show thus establishing his independence.

Portrait	Epithet	Name	Atabeg From	Atabeg Until	Relationship with Predecessor(s)	Notes	Title
	Imad al-Din	Zengi I	1135	1137	Son in Law of Radwan	Effective Reign 1128-1146	Atabeg of Halab

Zengi reconciled with the sultan and recognized his authority, but in practice he was independent in all but name.

When Nur ad-Din inherited Aleppo after father's murder, he took the title of King (Malik) and used the title of Emir. Formally, the Zengids were subordinate to the Seljuq Sultans of Iraq, firstly Mas'ud then Malik-Shah III followed by Muhammad II. Nur al-Din retained the title of atabeg although he was completely independent as the Seljuq empire disintegrated after 1156, and the sultans had to fight in Iraq to keep whats left of their authority. Muhammad II was the last Sultan to hold any real authority, and he attacked Baghdad aided by Nur al-Din's brother Qutb ad-Din Mawdud. Muhammad II death in 1159 and the fact that his successor Suleiman-Shah was a captive of Mawdud ended any real authority of the Seljuq Sultans, Nur al-Din Held the Khutbah in the name of the Abbasid Caliph, an enemy of the Seljuqs thus cutting any links with them.

Portrait	Epithet	Name	Emir From	Emir Until	Relationship with Predecessor(s)	Notes	Title
	Nur al-Din	Mahmud (Mahmud III)	1146	1174	Son of Imad al-Din	Also Emir of Damascus	Emir of Halab
	Al-Salih	Ismail	1174	1181	Son of Nur al-Din Mahmud		Sultan of Halab
	Izz al-Din	Mas'ud	1181	1182	Grandson of Imad al-Din		Emir of Halab
	Imad al-Din	Zengi II	1182	1183	Brother of 'Izz al-Din Mas'ud		Emir of Halab

== Ayyubids ==
The death of Nur al-Din caused chaos as al-Salih Ismail al-Malik, his son and successor was only eleven. The Zengid governors fought for power, each one of them trying to be the atabeg of al-Salih. One of them, Gümüshtekin, became the guardian of the young king and tried to eliminate the others causing the governor of Damascus to ask Saladin, the Zengid governor of Egypt, for help. Saladin, formally a subordinate to Al-Salih but practically independent, marched on Syria entering Damascus in November 1174. He besieged Aleppo, causing Al-Salih's cousin Ghazi II the Emir of Mosul to send his army which Saladin defeated at the battle of Tell al-Sultan, Saladin was proclaimed King of Egypt and Syria, the Caliph al-Mustadi conferred the Title of Sultan upon him.

Saladin met al-Salih and concluded a peace with the 13-year old king in 1176 leaving him to rule Aleppo independently for life while he (Saladin) ruled the rest of Syria.

After the death of al-Salih, Saladin expelled al-Salih's relative Zengi II and entered Aleppo on 20 June 1183 thus ending the Zengid Dynasty.

Portrait	Epithet	Name	Sultan From	Sultan Until	Relationship with Predecessor(s)	Notes	Title
	Al-Nasir Salah al-Din	Yusuf I	1183	1193	Married Mahmud III's Widow		Sultan of Halab
	Al-Zahir	Ghazi	1193	1216	Son of Salah al-Din		Sultan of Halab
	Al-Aziz	Muhammad	1216	1236	Son of Al-Zahir Ghazi		Sultan of Halab
	Al-Nasir	Yusuf II	1236	1260	Son of Al-Aziz	Regency council from 1236 to 1242, de facto regency of Dayfa Khatun; Also sultan of Damascus	Sultan of Halab

On 24 January 1260 the Mongol Khan Hulagu Khan entered Aleppo after a month of Siege thus ending the Ayyubid Dynasty.

== Mamluk sultans ==
The Mamluk Sultan Qutuz defeated the Mongols at Ain Jalut on 3 September 1260, the whole of Syria became part of the Mamluk Sultanate, Aleppo was the capital of its own province ruled by a Na'ib (Naib), some of these governors revolted and declared their independence in Aleppo like Shams al-Din Aqosh al-Borli who installed al-Hakim I as Abbasid Caliph in order to legitimize his reign while the Sultan Baibars I installed al-Mustansir II, other governors revolted with the aim of ruling the whole sultanate such as Yalbogha al-Nasiri who had Sultan Barquq dethroned in 1389.

Portrait	Epithet	Name	Sultan From	Sultan Until	Notes	Title
	Shams al-Din	Aqosh	1261	1261	Expelled by 'Ala' al-Din al-Bunduqdari General of Baibars I	Sultan of Halab

Aqosh eventually reconciled with the sultan, in 1404 Sayf al-Din Jakam revolted and declared himself Sultan.

Portrait	Epithet	Name	Sultan From	Sultan Until	Notes	Title
	Sayf al-Din	Jakam	1404	1406	First Reign: built the throne hall of Aleppo Citadel, eventually expelled	Sultan of Halab

Jakam Reoccupied the City and was pardoned and reappointed by the sultan, in May 1406 he was replaced by another Na'ib leading him to revolt again.

Portrait	Epithet	Name	Sultan From	Sultan Until	Notes	Title
	Sayf al-Din	Jakam	1407	1407	Second Reign, beheaded	Sultan of Halab

== See also ==
- Timeline of Aleppo
- State of Aleppo
- Rulers of Damascus
- List of Emirs of Mosul
