= Lulu of Aleppo =

Lulu of Aleppo may refer to:

- Lu'lu' al-Kabir, emir from 1002 until 1008/9
- Lu'lu' al-Yaya, atabeg from 1113 until 1117
