= Lu'lu' al-Kabir =

Lu'lu'

Emir of Aleppo
- Reign: January 1002–1008/9
- Predecessor: Sa'id al-Dawla
- Successor: Mansur ibn Lu'lu'
- Died: 1008/9; Aleppo, Syria
Names
- Abu Muhammad Lu'lu' al-Kabir al-Jarrahi al-Sayfi
- Dynasty: Hamdanid (by daughter's marriage)

Abu Muhammad Lu'lu', surnamed al-Kabir ("the Elder") and al-Jarrahi al-Sayfi ("[servant] of the Jarrahids and Sayf al-Dawla"), was a military slave (ghulam) of the Hamdanid Emirate of Aleppo. Under the rule of Sa'd al-Dawla, he rose to become the emirate's chamberlain, and on Sa'd al-Dawla's death in 991 he was appointed guardian of his son and successor, Sa'id al-Dawla. The able Lu'lu' soon became the de facto ruler of the emirate, securing his position by marrying his daughter to the young emir. His perseverance and aid from the Byzantine emperor Basil II preserved Aleppo from repeated Fatimid attempts to conquer it. Upon Sa'id al-Dawla's death in 1002—possibly poisoned by Lu'lu'—he became the ruler of the emirate, disinheriting Sa'id al-Dawla's sons. He ruled with wisdom until his death in 1008/9. He was succeeded by his son, Mansur, who managed to retain the throne until deposed in 1015/16.

== Early life and rise to power ==
Although not recorded in any historical source, his nisbas of "al-Jarrahi al-Sayfi" suggest that Lu'lu' was initially a servant of the Jarrahids of Palestine, before coming to serve the Hamdanid ruler of Aleppo, Sayf al-Dawla (r. 945–967), under whom he is attested in an expedition against Mopsuestia in 965. His name, meaning "pearl", was typical of the pet-names often given to the slave-soldiers and servants (ghilman, sing. ghulam) in the contemporary Muslim world. According to historian Fukuzo Amabe, Lu'lu' actually seems to have been a mawla (protege) of a certain ghulam of Sayf al-Dawla named Hajraj. Moreover, Amabe asserts that historian Marius Canard's identification of Hajraj with the Jarrahids "seems to be a mistake".

Under Sayf al-Dawla's successor Sa'd al-Dawla, Lu'lu' rose to become the chamberlain (hajib), a post he held at the time of Sa'd al-Dawla's death in 991. On his death-bed, the Hamdanid ruler entrusted to him the stewardship of his own son, Abu'l-Fada'il. Lu'lu' indeed secured the succession of Abu'l-Fada'il, better known as Sa'id al-Dawla, and helped save his life soon after his accession, when the adventurer Bakjur tried to seize Aleppo. Soon, he strengthened his own position by marrying his own daughter to the young emir, and came to exercise the effective rule of the state. Many of his rivals, resenting his power, defected upon Sa'd al-Dawla's death to the Fatimids, who now resumed their attacks on Aleppo. As Canard writes, "the history of [Sa'id al-Dawla's] reign is almost exclusively that of the attempts of Fatimid Egypt to gain the emirate of Aleppo, which were opposed by the Byzantine emperor".

== Between Byzantium and Fatimid Egypt ==
Encouraged by the Hamdanid defectors, the Fatimid caliph al-Aziz launched a first attack in 992, under the governor of Damascus, the Turkish general Manjutakin. The Fatimid general invaded the emirate, defeated a Byzantine force under the doux of Antioch, Michael Bourtzes, in June 992, and laid siege to Aleppo. He failed to pursue the siege with vigour, however, and the city was easily able to resist until, in the spring of 993, after thirteen months of campaigning, Manjutakin was forced to return to Damascus due to lack of supplies. In spring 994, Manjutakin launched another invasion, again defeated Bourtzes at the Battle of the Orontes, took Homs, Apamea and Shayzar and besieged Aleppo for eleven months. The blockade was far more effective this time and soon caused a severe lack of food, so that Sa'id al-Dawla suggested surrender. It was the determination of Lu'lu' that allowed the city's defenders to hold out until the sudden arrival of the Byzantine emperor, Basil II, in Syria in April 995. Basil, who had been campaigning in Bulgaria, had responded to the Hamdanids' plea for aid, and crossed Asia Minor in only sixteen days at the head of an army 13,000 strong. His sudden arrival caused panic in the Fatimid army, and Manjutakin burned his camp and retreated to Damascus without battle.

Sa'id al-Dawla and Lu'lu' prostrated themselves before the emperor in person as a sign of gratitude and submission, and he in turn released the emirate from its obligation to pay an annual tribute. Basil's interest in Syria was limited, however, and after a brief campaign that saw an unsuccessful attack on Tripoli, returned to Constantinople. Al-Aziz on the other hand now prepared for all-out war with the Byzantines, but his preparations were cut short by his death in October 996. The Byzantine–Fatimid contest over Syria continued, however, with alternating success. In 995, Lu'lu' made terms with al-Aziz and acknowledged him as Caliph, and for a few years Fatimid influence over Aleppo grew. In 996, the governor of Maarrat al-Nu'man rebelled and was forced to flee to the Fatimids. In 998 Lu'lu' and Sa'id al-Dawla tried to seize the fortress of Apamea, but were thwarted by the new Byzantine doux, Damian Dalassenos. Dalassenos' defeat and death in a battle with Bedouins shortly after caused another intervention by Basil in the next year, which stabilized the situation and strengthened Aleppo's security from Fatimid attack by placing a Byzantine garrison at Shayzar. The conflict ended with another treaty in 1001 and the conclusion of a ten-year truce.

== Ruler of Aleppo ==
In January 1002, Sa'id al-Dawla died, although according to a tradition recorded by Ibn al-Adim, he was poisoned at the behest of Lu'lu'. Along with his son Mansur, Lu'lu' now assumed direct power over Aleppo, at first as ostensible guardians over Sa'id al-Dawla's sons Abu'l-Hasan Ali and Abu'l-Ma'ali Sharif, until, in 1003/4, he had them exiled to Egypt. According to Yaqut al-Hamawi, Lu'lu' al-Kabir ruined the "celebrated fortress" of Kafr Rumah when he conquered Aleppo in 393 (1003).

As Emir of Aleppo, Lu'lu' was a capable ruler, who was remembered for his wisdom and justice. He also managed to maintain the balance between Byzantium and the Fatimids: although he recognized Fatimid suzerainty, he continued to pay tribute to Byzantium, and imprisoned the adventurer al-Asfar, who dreamed of launching jihad against the Byzantine Empire. Lu'lu' died in 1008/9, and was succeeded by his son Mansur. Mansur was unpopular, faced several challenges to his rule by rival factions and tribes, and quickly became subordinate to the Fatimids. In the end, he was deposed by a popular uprising in 1015/16 and forced to find refuge in Byzantine territory.

According to Marius Canard, "Lu'lu' presents the image of a slave (ghulam) who, by his energy and ability, and favoured by external events, succeeds in hoisting himself up to a position of supremacy over an emirate, admittedly an emirate of secondary importance. It could be said that he prefigures in the 5th/11th century what various of the Mamluks of Egypt were to become on a larger scale."

== Sources ==
- Canard, Marius (1971). "Ḥamdānids". In Lewis, B.; Ménage, V. L.; Pellat, Ch. & Schacht, J. (eds.). The Encyclopaedia of Islam, Second Edition. Volume III: H–Iram. Leiden: E. J. Brill. pp. 126–131. OCLC 495469525.
- Canard, Marius (1986). "Luʾluʾ". In Bosworth, C. E.; van Donzel, E.; Lewis, B. & Pellat, Ch. (eds.). The Encyclopaedia of Islam, Second Edition. Volume V: Khe–Mahi. Leiden: E. J. Brill. p. 820. ISBN 978-90-04-07819-2.
- Kennedy, Hugh N. (2004). The Prophet and the Age of the Caliphates: The Islamic Near East from the 6th to the 11th Century (Second ed.). Harlow: Pearson Education Ltd. ISBN 0-582-40525-4.
- Le Strange, G. (1890). Palestine Under the Moslems: A Description of Syria and the Holy Land from A.D. 650 to 1500. Committee of the Palestine Exploration Fund.
- Stevenson, William B. (1926). "Chapter VI. Islam in Syria and Egypt (750–1100)". In Bury, John Bagnell (ed.). The Cambridge Medieval History, Volume V: Contest of Empire and Papacy]. New York: The Macmillan Company. pp. 242–264.
- Whittow, Mark (1996). The Making of Byzantium, 600–1025. Berkeley: University of California Press. ISBN 978-0-520-20496-6.

Preceded by Sa'id al-Dawla	Emir of Aleppo; 1002–1008/9	Succeeded by Mansur ibn Lu'lu'
