= Mount of Olives Hoshana Rabbah ceremony =

Annual medieval Jewish gathering in Jerusalem

The Mount of Olives Hoshana Rabbah ceremony was an annual Hoshana Rabbah gathering organized by the Palestinian Gaonate. Overlooking the Temple Mount from the Mount of Olives, a series of proclamations relating to the Jewish calendar and other matters were made before a crowd of Jews hailing from the Land of Israel and the diaspora, some coming as far as modern-day France and Germany. Donors were recognized from Jewish communities around the known world, including Egypt, Sicily, the Maghreb, Tyre, and Syria. Attendance was seen as obligatory for those with the means to do so. The ceremony, in effect, reinforced the sovereignty and primacy of the Palestinian Gaonate over world Jewry. It most likely occurred from the late ninth or early tenth century to the late eleventh century, coinciding with the Palestinian Gaonate's presence in Jerusalem. Some sources, however, indicate earlier origins.

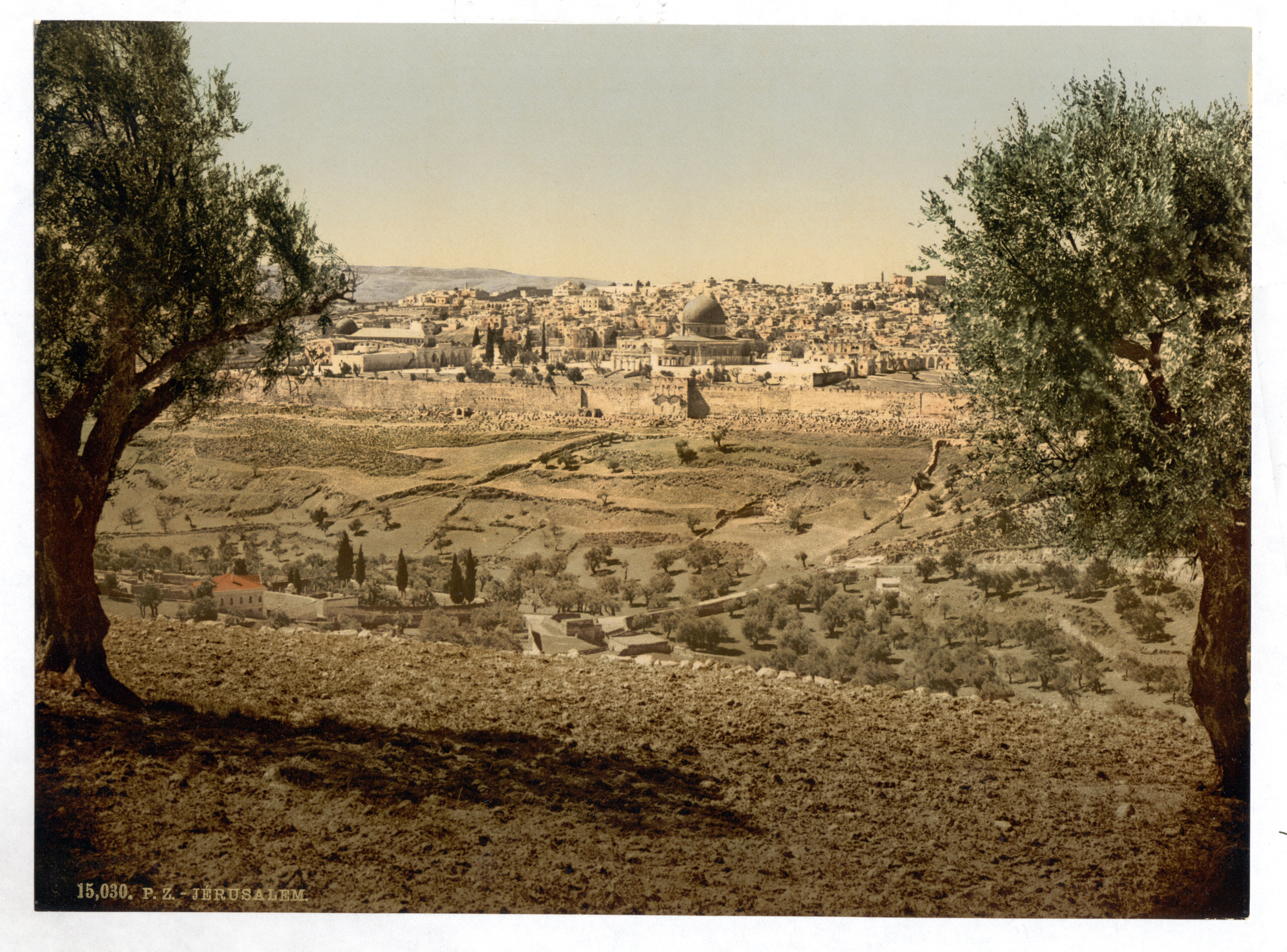
The view of the Temple Mount from the Mount of Olives

== Components ==
The gathering was a multi-part ceremony that began with circling the Mount of Olives seven times in song and prayer. After ascending the mount, the Gaon delivered a sermon. The remainder of the ceremony consisted of:

- Pronouncements of new high-level appointments, including new Gaonate members, communal judges, and high-ranking officials such as the seven elders at the helm of the Gaonate.
- Appeals for financial support for the Gaonate.
- The public announcement of the names of donors to the Gaonate, accompanied by prayers on their behalf.
- Pronouncements of calendrical dates for the upcoming year.
- Individual excommunications against those who rejected halakha or the authority of the Gaonate.
- A general excommunication of the Karaites.

== Historical incidents ==
=== The 1029–1030 excommunication crisis ===
The ceremony was likely suspended between 1024 and 1029 due to the Jarrahid wars, which halted pilgrimage traffic across the region and brought severe hardship to Jerusalem's Jewish community. When the Hoshana Rabbah gathering finally resumed in the autumn of 1029, the atmosphere was highly volatile. During the festival, a group of Rabbanite pilgrims attempted to pressure the Gaon, Shelomo ben Yehuda, into issuing an excommunication against the Karaites, who were said to eat meat with milk. When he refused, the crowd turned on him, claiming he was bribed by the Karaites.

Eventually, these pilgrims were convinced to withdraw their demands due to the interventions of Muslim Fatimid rulers, with the support of the Gaon. To deter riots, the local governor of Jerusalem, Fath al-Qal'i, attended the 1029 and 1030 ceremonies in person, the latter time armed with lashes and chains to enforce the peace.

== Decline and end ==
The ceremony largely ended with the Turkmen conquest of Jerusalem in the 1070s, with the Gaonate moving north to Tyre. Attempts to perform this ceremony in Tyre in 1081 and Haifa in 1082 failed to draw pilgrims.

== Bibliography ==
- Laufer, Tal (2025). "Religion and Politics Among the Jewish Leadership of Early Medieval Palestine". Religions 16: 783. https://doi.org/10.3390/rel16060783
- Rustow, Marina (2008). Heresy and the Politics of Community: The Jews of the Fatimid Caliphate. Ithaca: Cornell University Press.
- Stern, Sacha (2019). "Palestinians and Babylonians in Conflict: A Narrative." In The Jewish Calendar Controversy of 921/2 CE. Leiden: Brill. https://doi.org/10.1163/9789004388673_003.
