= Fath al-Qal'i =

Emir of Aleppo
- Reign: January 1016–October 1016
- Predecessor: Mansur ibn Lu'lu'
- Successor: Aziz al-Dawla
Names
- Abū Naṣr Fatḥ al-Qalʿī
Regnal name
- Mubārak al-Dawla wa-Saʿīd-hā
- Occupation: Previous posts: Governor of Aleppo Citadel (pre-1014–October 1016); Later posts: Fatimid governor of Tyre (October 1016–N/A); Fatimid governor of Jerusalem (ca. 1024–ca. 1030)

Abu Nasr Fath al-Qal'i, also known by his laqab (honorific epithet) of Mubarak al-Dawla wa-Sa'id-ha ("Blessed and Happiness of the State"), was the governor of the Citadel of Aleppo during the reign of Emir Mansur ibn Lu'lu' (r. 1008–1016). In 1016, he rebelled against Mansur, in likely collusion with Salih ibn Mirdas, forcing Mansur to flee. After a few months, Fath relinquished control of Aleppo to the Fatimid Caliphate, marking the beginning of direct Fatimid rule over the city. Afterward, he held posts in Tyre, then Jerusalem. As governor of Jerusalem, Fath helped the Fatimid general Anushtakin al-Dizbari suppress a rebellion by the Jarrahids in 1024–1025 and maintained order between the Rabbinate and Karaite Jewish sects during the Hoshana Rabbah festivals at the Mount of Olives in 1029 and 1030.

== Early career ==
Fath was a ghulām (slave soldier) of Mansur ibn Lu'lu', the emir of Aleppo between 1008 and 1016. It is not clear when Fath was appointed as governor of the Citadel of Aleppo, but he was governor by at least 1014. The name Fath al-Qal'i translates from Arabic as "Fath of the Citadel". That year, he may have colluded to free the Kilabi chieftain Salih ibn Mirdas from the citadel's dungeon. Salih soon after became a major opponent of Mansur, capturing him the same year of his prison escape then releasing him in return for half of Aleppo's revenues. Conflict between Salih and Mansur renewed when Mansur reneged on their agreement and the Kilab besieged Aleppo.

== Rebellion ==
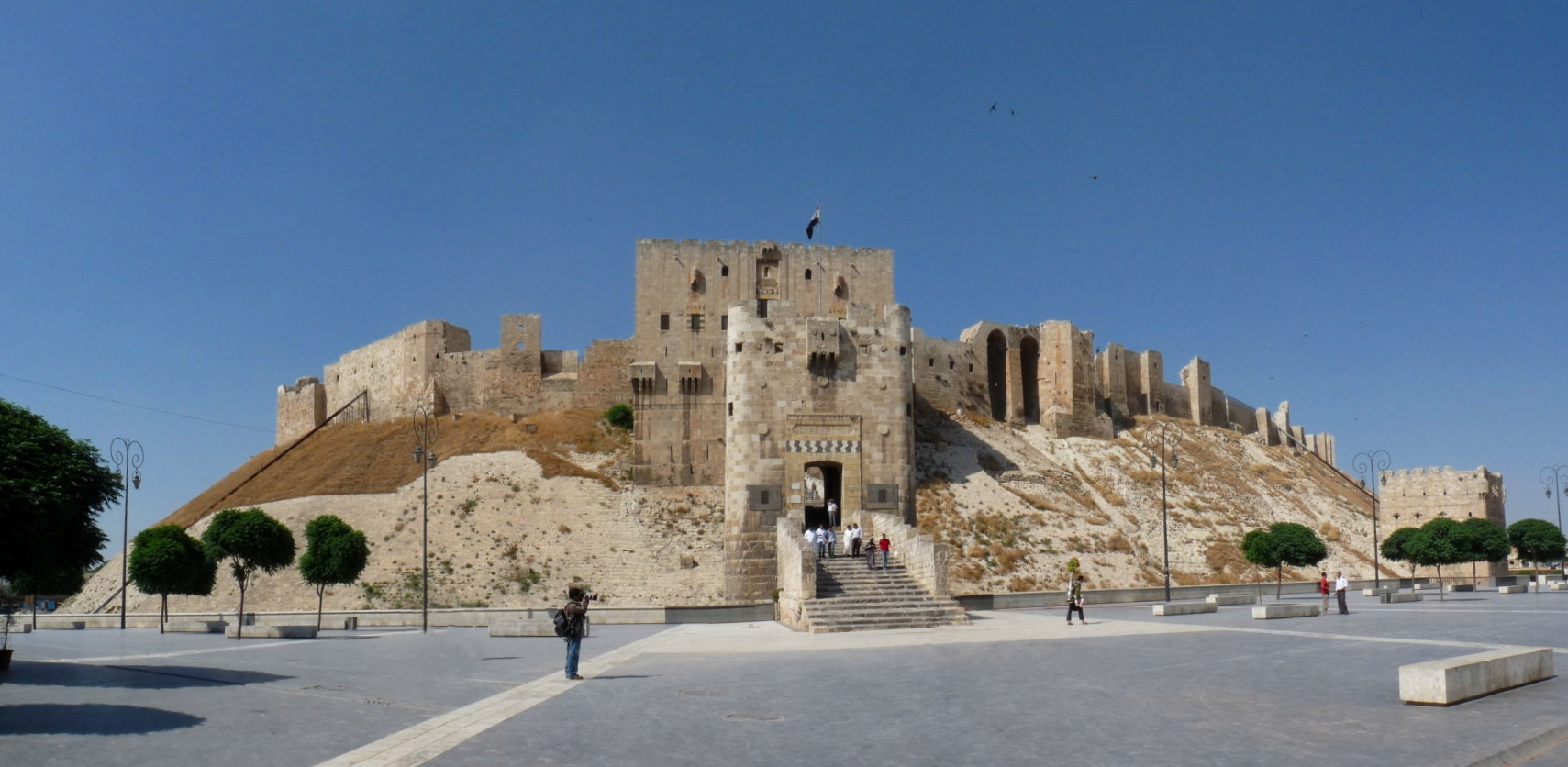
The Citadel of Aleppo in 2010. Fath was the governor of the citadel under Mansur ibn Lu'lu' and derived his surname al-Qal'i (of the Citadel) from this position.

On 7 January 1016, Fath rebelled against Mansur in probable collusion with Salih. The rebellion was precipitated by Fath's awareness of Mansur's intrigues against him; Mansur accused Fath of connivance with Salih. Fath's action prompted Mansur to flee Aleppo. An agreement was reached between Fath and Salih on the morning of the rebellion to fulfill Mansur's agreement with the latter regarding the sharing of the Emirate of Aleppo's revenues. However, at the same time, Fath aimed to further secure his position by appealing to the Fatimid governor of Afamiyah, Ali al-Dayf, to send troops to Aleppo, which al-Dayf did. Fath also wrote to Fatimid Caliph al-Hakim and gave the latter his allegiance. Al-Hakim thanked Fath and bestowed on him the title of mubārak al-dawla wa-saʿīd-hā (blessed and happiness of the State).

Salih opposed the Fatimid military presence in Aleppo, which he coveted, and warned and advised Fath to force them out with the help Salih's Kilabi tribesmen. Salih offered Fath an agreement whereby Fath would continue to hold the citadel, while the Kilab would control the hinterland of Aleppo. Al-Hakim concurrently pressured Fath to relinquish Aleppo to Fatimid administration in return for a lifetime iqtaʿ (fief) consisting of Sidon, Tyre and Beirut and all of the treasures of Aleppo's citadel. Fath went to Salih with this information, and was advised to decline al-Hakim's offer. Indeed, Fath was inclined to accept Salih's arrangement, but he faced protests from the people of Aleppo, who rejected the Bedouin rule of the Kilab. Meanwhile, al-Dayf requested reinforcements from al-Hakim, who dispatched troops from Tripoli and Sidon. Al-Hakim also had the Tayy and Kalb tribes move toward Aleppo to back Fatimid troops. Fath and Salih were militarily unprepared to face these forces. Thus, Fath accepted al-Hakim's proposed assignment to Tyre and departed Aleppo.

== Later posts ==
Fath was replaced by the first Fatimid-appointed governor of Aleppo, Aziz al-Dawla, in October 1016. Fath governed Tyre for some time before being appointed governor of Jerusalem during the reign of Caliph az-Zahir, by at least the mid-1020s. In 1024, the Jarrahid chieftain of the Tayy, Hassan ibn Mufarrij, assaulted Jerusalem during his rebellion against Anushtakin al-Dizbari, the Fatimid governor of Palestine. Hassan imposed a fine of 30,000 gold dinars on Fath and looted the money al-Dizbari stored in the city. Fath later fought alongside al-Dizbari during an assault on Hassan's camp outside Ramla in February 1025.

Fath was apparently still governor of Jerusalem in 1029 and 1030. During both years, he supervised the Hoshana Rabbah festival at the Mount of Olives, one of the largest Jewish pilgrimage gatherings of the year at the time. During the 1029 festival, which was the first such festival to be held since the Jarrahid revolt of 1024, the Rabbinate religious establishment attempted to excommunicate members of the Karaite sect en masse. However, the move was voided by the intervention of the Jewish geonim leaders and local Fatimid governors, including Fath and al-Dizbari. The following year, al-Dizbari issued an edict warning the Rabbinates not to ban the Karaites and had Fath and his troops supervise the festival with lashes and chains prepared to deter such actions.

== Bibliography ==
- Bianquis, Thierry (1993). "Mirdas". In Bosworth, C. E.; van Donzel, E.; Heinrichs, W. P. & Pellat, Ch. (eds.). The Encyclopaedia of Islam, Second Edition. Volume VII: Mif–Naz. Leiden: E. J. Brill. pp. 115–123. ISBN 978-90-04-09419-2.
- Gil, Moshe (1997) [1983]. A History of Palestine, 634–1099. Translated by Ethel Broido. Cambridge: Cambridge University Press. ISBN 0-521-59984-9.
- Rustow, Marina (2008). Heresy and the Politics of Community: The Jews of the Fatimid Caliphate. Ithaca: Cornell University Press. p. 218.
- Zakkar, Suhayl (1971). The Emirate of Aleppo: 1004–1094. Aleppo: Dar al-Amanah.

Preceded by Mansur ibn Lu'lu'	Emir of Aleppo; January 1016–October 1016	Succeeded by Aziz al-Dawla
