= Battle of Aleppo =

The Battle of Aleppo may refer to:

- Battle of Aleppo (1918), during World War I
- Battle of Aleppo (2012–2016), during the Syrian Civil War
- Battle of Aleppo (2024), during the Syrian Civil War
- Aleppo clashes (2025–2026), during the Syrian conflict

== See also ==
- Siege of Aleppo
- Sack of Aleppo
