= Capture of Aleppo (1516) =

1516 Ottoman capture of Aleppo

- Part of Ottoman–Mamluk War (1516–1517)
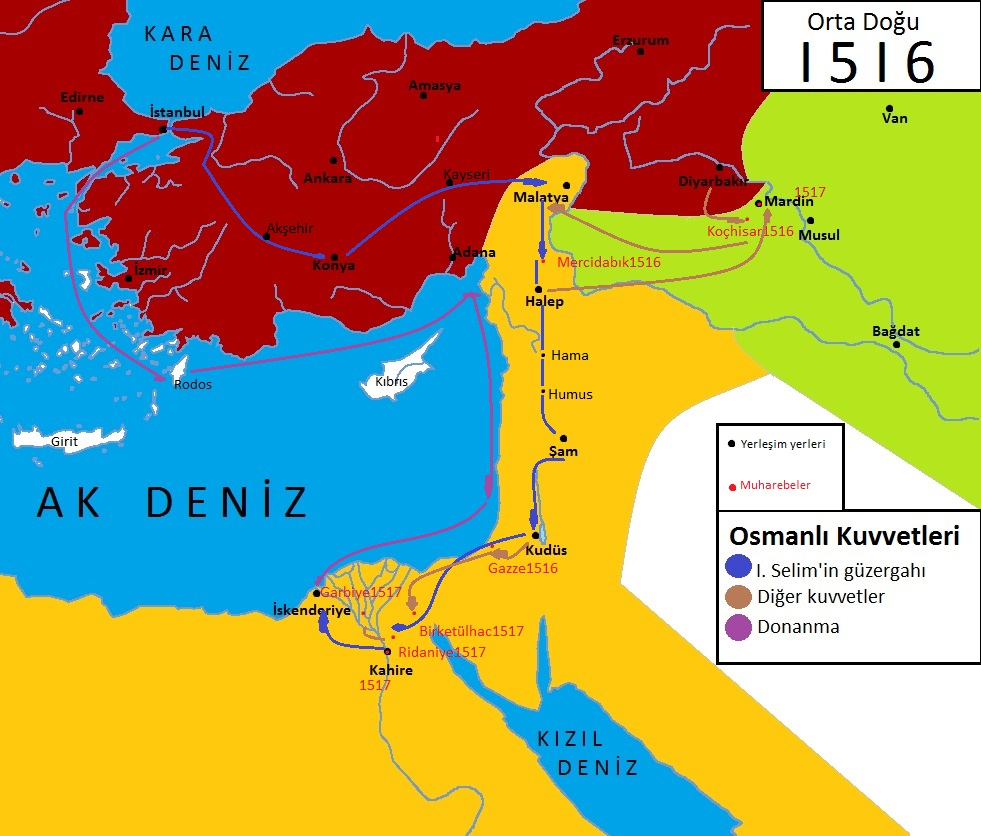
- Selim I's campaign in Syria and Egypt
Date	28 August 1516
Location	Aleppo, Syria
Result	Ottoman victory
Territorial changes	Aleppo annexed into Ottoman territory

Belligerents
Ottoman Empire	Mamluk Sultanate

Commanders and leaders
Selim I	Hayır Bey

Casualties and losses
Unknown	9,400 civilians massacred

The Capture of Aleppo was a phase of the Ottoman–Mamluk War (1516–1517). After inflicting a heavy defeat on the Mamluk army commanded by Qansuh al-Ghawri at the Battle of Marj Dabiq on 24 August 1516, the Ottoman army under Selim I continued its advance and entered Aleppo on 28 August 1516.

== Campaign and establishment of Ottoman administration in Aleppo ==
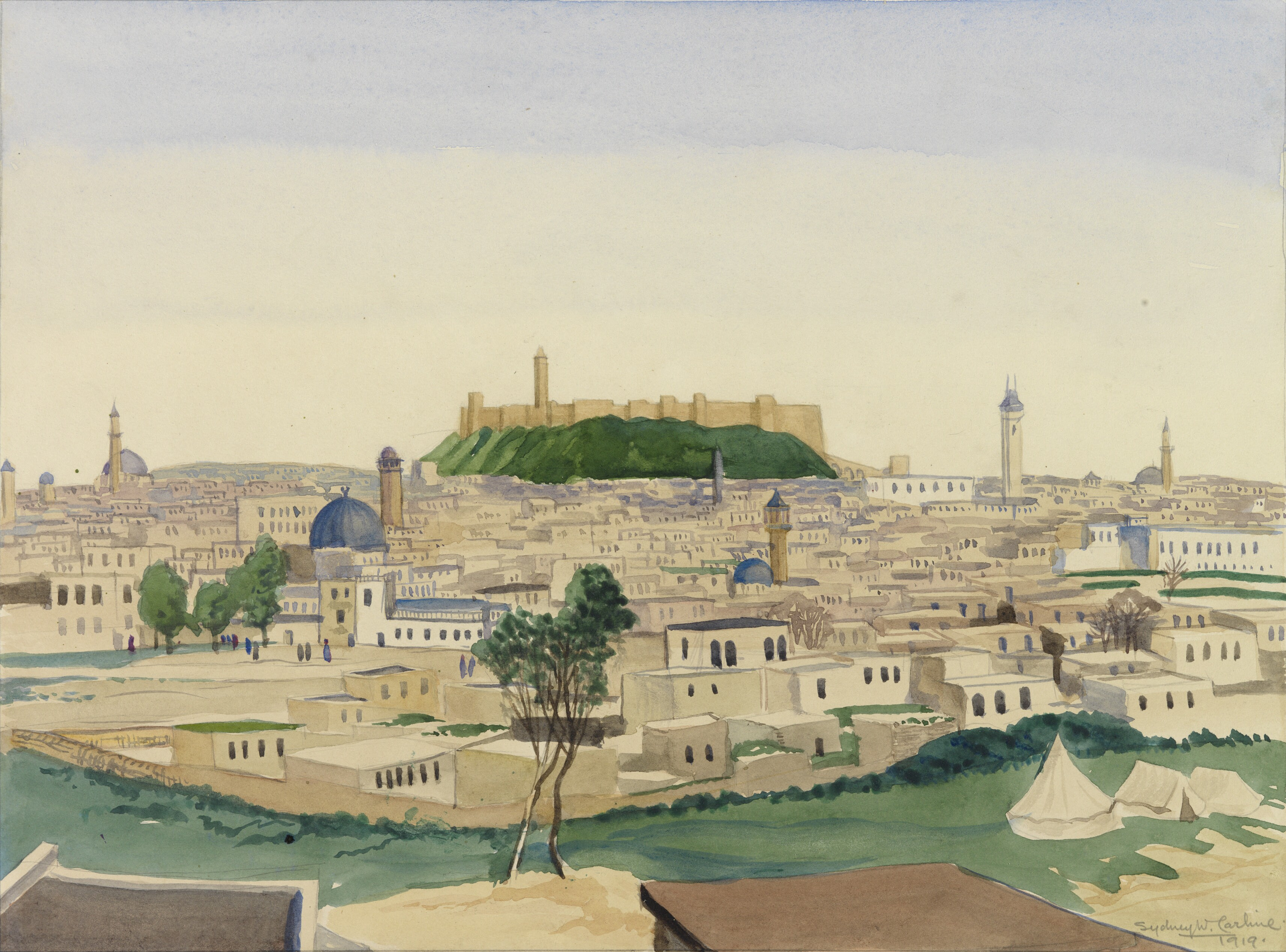
The city of Aleppo

Following the Ottoman victory at the Battle of Marj Dabiq, the people of Aleppo opened the gates of the Citadel of Aleppo and greeted Selim I outside the city, pledging their allegiance.

The Ottomans seized one million Egyptian ashrafi gold coins from the treasury in Aleppo, along with over 200 okkas of gold bullion, and equivalent quantities of jewels, precious fabrics, and furs. Selim I stayed in Aleppo for 19 days, overseeing the establishment of Ottoman administration. As part of this, Karaca Ahmed Pasha was appointed as the governor (Beylerbeyi) of Aleppo Eyalet, and Çömlekçizâde Kemal Çelebi was appointed as qadi.

On Friday, 29 August, Selim I attended Friday prayers at the Great Mosque of Aleppo, where the preacher referred to him in the sermon as "Servant of the Two Holy Sanctuaries" (Khādim al-Ḥaramayn al-Sharīfayn). In response, Selim took off his robe, worth a thousand gold coins, and gifted it to the preacher. (Some sources claim this event took place in Damascus.) Following the Ottoman victory at Marj Dabiq and the incorporation of Aleppo into Ottoman territory, other Mamluk strongholds in the region, including Malatya, Divriği, Darende, Antioch, and Rumkale, surrendered without resistance.

While still in Aleppo, Selim I dispatched Bıyıklı Mehmed Pasha, who had joined the Ottoman army before the Battle of Marj Dabiq, to Mardin, which had been resisting a siege by Deli Husrev Pasha since June. Selim himself departed from Aleppo on 15 September 1516 and advanced toward Damascus with the Ottoman army. On 19 September, the Ottomans took Hama, followed by Homs on 21 September, and finally entered Damascus on 27 September 1516.
