= Siege of Aleppo (1024–1025) =

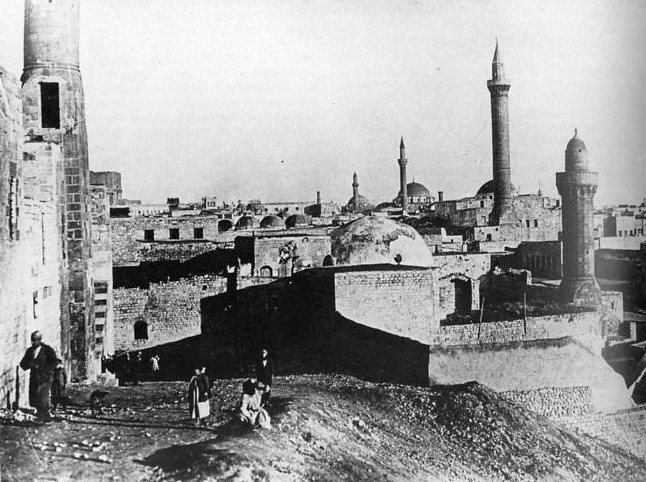
- mosque Citadel of Aleppo in 1900
Date	November 1024–January 1025
Location	Aleppo, Syria, Fatimid Caliphate
Result	Banu Kilab victory
Territorial changes	The Banu Kilab tribe (later the Mirdasids) gained control over Aleppo.

Belligerents
Fatimid Caliphate	Banu Kilab

Commanders and leaders
Salim bin Mustafad (surrendered); Thu'ban ibn Muhammad (POW); Abu al-Fadl ibn Abi Usama (POW); Mawsuf al-Saqlabi (POW)	Salih ibn Mirdas

The Siege of Aleppo began in early November 1024, led by Salih ibn Mirdas, the leader of the Banu Kilab tribe.

== Background ==
In 970, the Fatimid Caliphate held full control over the Levant, and its influence was powerful. However, in Aleppo and northern Syria, this authority weakened significantly and became highly unstable. In November 1024, Salih ibn Mirdas, the leader of the Arab Banu Kilab tribe, took advantage of this severe weakness during the reign of the Fatimid Caliph Al-Zahir li-i'zaz Din Allah. Salih received an invitation from the people of Aleppo, who had grown deeply tired of the poor Fatimid administration.

== Siege ==
After responding to the invitation from the people of Aleppo, Salih ibn Mirdas assembled a large army and marched toward the city, arriving at one of its gates known as Bab al-Jinan. Upon his arrival, skirmishes and clashes broke out between his forces and the Fatimid army. However, because the citizens of Aleppo supported Salih ibn Mirdas, the Fatimid commander Salim ibn Mustafad, chose to open all the city gates and surrender completely along with the city.

Meanwhile, the remaining Fatimid commanders fled to the Citadel of Aleppo to fortify themselves inside. Among them was Sadid al-Mulk Thu'ban, the governor of the citadel. Salih ibn Mirdas then besieged the citadel, deploying catapults and siege engines to bombard its walls. The siege lasted for seven full months until the citadel's water supply completely ran dry. Left with nothing to drink, the defenders were ultimately forced to come out and surrender completely to the forces of Salih ibn Mirdas.

== Aftermath ==
After settling in Aleppo, Salih ibn Mirdas restored the city's walls and the Great Palace. He established the Mirdasid Emirate as a de facto independent Arab state, skillfully balancing relations between the Fatimids in Egypt and the Byzantine Empire to the north.

This victory dramatically reshaped the political landscape of the Levant. Fatimid influence declined significantly, while the Mirdasid state expanded rapidly across the region. In the same year, Salih captured several important cities, extending his rule from Aleppo in the north to Homs, Baalbek, and as far south as Sidon in present-day Lebanon.
