= Sa'd al-Dawla of Aleppo =

Hamdanid ruler of Aleppo from 967 to 991

Sa'd al-Dawla سعد الدولة

Emir of Aleppo
- Reign: 967–991
- Predecessor: Sayf al-Dawla
- Successor: Sa'id al-Dawla
- Born: 952
- Died: December 991; Aleppo
Names
- Sa'd al-Dawla Abu'l-Ma'ali Sharif
- Dynasty: Hamdanid
- Father: Sayf al-Dawla
- Mother: Sakhinah
- Religion: Shia Islam

Abu 'l-Ma'ali Sharif, more commonly known by his honorific title, Sa'd al-Dawla (Arabic: سعد الدولة), was the second ruler of the Hamdanid Emirate of Aleppo, encompassing most of northern Syria. The son of the emirate's founder, Sayf al-Dawla, he inherited the throne at a young age and in the midst of a major offensive by the Byzantine emperor Nikephoros II Phokas that within two years conquered the western portions of his realm and turned Aleppo into a tributary state. Facing a multitude of rebellions and desertions until 977, Sa'd was unable even to enter his own capital, which was in the hands of his father's chief minister, Qarquya. By maintaining close relations with the Buyids, he managed to re-establish his authority in parts of the Jazira, but his rule was soon challenged by the rebellion of his governor Bakjur, who was supported by the Fatimids of Egypt. In turn, Sa'd came to rely increasingly on Byzantine assistance, although he continued to fluctuate in his allegiance between Byzantium, the Buyids, and the Fatimids.

== Biography ==
=== Early years ===
Family tree of the Hamdanid dynasty

Sa'd al-Dawla was the son of Sayf al-Dawla, the first Emir of Aleppo, and Sakhinah, the sister of Sayf al-Dawla's cousin and court poet, Abu Firas. At the time of his father's death, in February 967, he was only fifteen, and resided at the emirate's Jaziran capital, Mayyafariqin. His succession to the emirate was unopposed, but the state his father had left him was crumbling: the Byzantine emperor Nikephoros II had just conquered Cilicia and was raiding its northern and western provinces, while rebellions of his closest lieutenants had plagued Sayf al-Dawla's last years.

Sa'd al-Dawla reached Aleppo, which for years had been governed by Sayf al-Dawla's chief minister and chamberlain (hajib), Qarquya, in June/July 967. Almost immediately he was confronted by a rebellion of his uncle, Abu Firas, at the time governor of Homs, which lasted until the latter's death in battle in April 968. At the same time, Aleppo itself was threatened by the Byzantines, and Sa'd al-Dawla, on the advice of Qarquya, left the city. The Byzantines did not attack the city, but Qarquya and his fellow ghilman (military slaves) seized the moment to claim the city for themselves. Accompanied by 300 faithful followers, Sa'd al-Dawla was thus reduced to wandering from city to city across the lands that were nominally his, hoping to gain entry: Saruj, Manbij and Harran refused to support him, while at Mayyafariqin his own mother refused to let him in. Finally, he found refuge at Homs. In the meantime, many of his father's old supporters left to join his cousin Abu Taghlib, Emir of Mosul, who used the opportunity to expand his own territory. Immediately after Sayf al-Dawla's death, he captured Raqqa, and by 971 extended his control over the provinces of Diyar Bakr and Diyar Mudar. Sa'd al-Dawla, unable to offer any resistance, tacitly accepted these losses as well as his cousin's suzerainty.

The year 969 was a crucial one in Syrian history, as it marked the climax of the Byzantine advance. In October, the generals Michael Bourtzes and Peter captured Antioch, securing their control over the north Syrian littoral. Soon after, the Byzantines marched against Aleppo itself and forced Qarquya to sign a treaty (December 969 or January 970) making Aleppo a tributary Byzantine protectorate with Qarquya as emir and his deputy, Bakjur, as his designated successor. At the same time, in Egypt, the Fatimids defeated the Ikhshidids and gained control of the country, from where they advanced into southern Syria. The competition between these two powers, Byzantium and the Fatimids, would shape the history of Syria and of Aleppo for the next fifty years.

=== Recovery of Aleppo ===
It was not until 977 that Sa'd al-Dawla managed to regain his capital, which by now was under the control of Bakjur, who in 975 had deposed and imprisoned Qarquya. Aided by some of his father's ghilman, and, crucially, the powerful Banu Kilab tribe living around Aleppo, Sa'd al-Dawla besieged Aleppo and captured it. Qarquya was set free and again entrusted with the affairs of state until his death a few years later, while Bakjur was given the governorship of Homs.

Soon after, in 979, he was able to capitalize upon Abu Taghlib's conflict with the Buyids of Iraq to recover some of his father's domains in the Jazira: after acknowledging Buyid suzerainty, he received governorship of the Diyar Mudar, except for Raqqa and Rahba. At the same time, he also received from the Abbasid caliph—who was a puppet of the Buyids—the honorific laqab of Sa'd al-Dawla (lit. 'The Fortune of the Rule/State'), by which he is known.

=== Conflicts with Bakjur, the Fatimids and Byzantium ===
Bakjur, in the meantime, had used his new post at Homs to open contacts with the Fatimids, who intended to use him as a pawn to subdue Aleppo and complete their conquest of the entirety of Syria. Sa'd al-Dawla himself oscillated between the Fatimids and Byzantium: on the one hand he resented Byzantine overlordship and was willing to acknowledge the Fatimid Caliph, but on the other hand he did not want to see his domain become merely another Fatimid province like southern Syria.

His first attempt to free himself of the Byzantine protectorate, in 981, ended in failure due to lack of outside support, when a Byzantine army appeared before Aleppo's walls to enforce compliance. The Fatimids then induced Bakjur to act: in September 983, Bakjur launched an attack on Aleppo with the support of Fatimid troops. Sa'd al-Dawla was forced to appeal to the Byzantine emperor Basil II for help, and the siege was raised by a Byzantine army under Bardas Phokas the Younger. The Byzantines then proceeded to sack Homs in October. The city was returned to Hamdanid control, while Bakjur fled to Fatimid territory, where he assumed the governorship of Damascus. It is an indication of the strained relations between Sa'd al-Dawla and his "saviours" that after Bakjur's flight, there were clashes between Byzantine and Hamdanid troops, which were settled only when the Hamdanid emir agreed to pay twice the usual yearly amount of tribute of 20,000 gold dinars.

Hamdanid relations with Byzantium collapsed completely in 985–986, after the Fatimids took the Byzantine fortress of Balanyas. Sa'd al-Dawla refused to continue paying tribute. As a result, Bardas Phokas invaded his territory and sacked Killis before retracing his steps and marching south to an unsuccessful siege of Apamea (Qalaat al-Madiq). In retaliation, Sa'd al-Dawla sent his troops to raze the famous monastery of Qal'at Sim'an. However, soon after that, in May 986, the prospect of an imminent conclusion of a peace between Byzantium and Egypt forced Sa'd al-Dawla to return to his earlier allegiance, and he re-affirmed his tributary status on the same terms as before. This did not prevent Sa'd al-Dawla from supporting the Byzantine general Bardas Skleros in his second rebellion against Basil II, once he was released from Buyid captivity in December 986, nor of recognizing Fatimid suzerainty in the same month, especially as Byzantium now descended into a civil war that lasted until 989.

Warfare with the Fatimids once again threatened in 991, again because of Bakjur. He had governed Damascus until 988, when he was deposed, and then fled to Raqqa. From there, though with little support from the Fatimids, he tried to attack Aleppo. With Byzantine assistance in the form of troops under the doux of Antioch, Michael Bourtzes, Sa'd al-Dawla was able to defeat and capture Bakjur at Na'ura, east of Aleppo, in April 991, and later had him executed. Nevertheless, relations with the Fatimids soured over Sa'd al-Dawla's arrest of Bakjur's children, and it was only his death from hemiplegia in December 991 that stopped him from attacking Fatimid possessions.

=== Succession and the end of the Hamdanid dynasty in Aleppo ===
Sa'd al-Dawla was succeeded by his son, Sa'id Abu 'l-Fada'il Sa'id al-Dawla, but real power rested in the hands of Sa'd al-Dawla's former chamberlain, Lu'lu'. Several of the Hamdanid ghilman, resenting the influence of Lu'lu', went over to the Fatimids, who now launched a sustained offensive against Aleppo under the Turkish general Manjutakin. Only the personal intervention of Basil II in 995 and again in 999 would save the emirate from Fatimid conquest. Warfare lasted until 1000, when a peace treaty was concluded guaranteeing Aleppo's continued existence as a buffer state between the two powers. Finally, in 1002, Lu'lu' assassinated Sa'id al-Dawla and assumed control of Aleppo in his own name.

== Bibliography ==
- Canard, Marius (1971). "Ḥamdānids". In Lewis, B.; Ménage, V. L.; Pellat, Ch. & Schacht, J. (eds.). The Encyclopaedia of Islam, Second Edition. Volume III: H–Iram. Leiden: E. J. Brill. pp. 126–131. OCLC 495469525.
- El Tayib, Abdullah (1990). "Abū Firās al-Ḥamdānī". In Ashtiany, Julia; Johnstone, T. M.; Latham, J. D.; Serjeant, R. B.; Smith, G. Rex (eds.). ʿAbbasid Belles-Lettres. Cambridge: Cambridge University Press. pp. 315–327. ISBN 0-521-24016-6.
- Kennedy, Hugh (2004) [1986]. The Prophet and the Age of the Caliphates: The Islamic Near East from the 6th to the 11th Century (Second ed.). Harlow: Longman. ISBN 978-0-582-40525-7.
- Stevenson, William B. (1926). "Chapter VI. Islam in Syria and Egypt (750–1100)". In Bury, John Bagnell (ed.). The Cambridge Medieval History, Volume V: Contest of Empire and Papacy. New York: The Macmillan Company. pp. 242–264.
- Whittow, Mark (1996). The Making of Byzantium, 600–1025. Berkeley and Los Angeles, California: University of California Press. ISBN 978-0-520-20496-6.

Preceded by Sayf al-Dawla	Emir of Aleppo; 967–991	Succeeded by Sa'id al-Dawla
