= Sack of Aleppo =

Sack of Aleppo may refer to:

- Sack of Aleppo (962)
- Sack of Aleppo (1400)
