= Bakjur =

10th-century Circassian mamluk military officer

Bakjur was a Circassian military slave (mamluk or ghulam) who served the Hamdanids of Aleppo and later the Fatimids of Egypt. He seized control of Aleppo in 975 and governed it until 977, when the rightful Hamdanid ruler, Sa'd al-Dawla, regained it. Given the governorship of Homs, in 983 he went over to the Fatimids and launched an attack on Aleppo, which was defeated through the intervention of Byzantine troops. Bakjur then became governor of Damascus for the Fatimids until 988. He made a last attempt to capture Aleppo in 991, which again was defeated thanks to Byzantine assistance. Bakjur was captured by Sa'd al-Dawla and executed.

== Life ==
Bakjur was a Circassian military slave (mamluk or ghulam), originally recruited by the Hamdanids. By 969, he had risen to be the deputy of Qarquya, the powerful chamberlain (hajib) of the emir Sayf al-Dawla. After the latter's death in 967 Qarquya took over rule of Aleppo, effectively dispossessing Sayf al-Dawla's son Sa'd al-Dawla, who after long wanderings managed to find refuge in Homs.

Syria (Bilad al-Sham) and its provinces in the 9th century

In 975, Bakjur deposed and imprisoned Qarquya and seized Aleppo for himself. This encouraged Sa'd al-Dawla to attempt to recover his father's capital. Aided by some of his father's ghulams, and, crucially, the powerful Banu Kilab tribe living around Aleppo, Sa'd al-Dawla besieged Aleppo and captured it. Qarquya was set free and again entrusted with the affairs of state until his death a few years later, while Bakjur was given the governorship of Homs in compensation. Sa'd al-Dawla had recovered control of his emirate, but his position was precarious: Aleppo was situated between two great powers, the Byzantine Empire and the Fatimid Caliphate, who vied for control over the Hamdanid emirate, and northern Syria with it. Since 969, Aleppo had been tributary to the Byzantines, a fact Sa'd al-Dawla resented. On the other hand, he was dependent on Byzantine aid to prevent the Fatimid caliph, al-Aziz, from annexing the emirate outright. As a result, his policy vacillated between the two powers.

In 983, Bakjur quarrelled with Sa'd al-Dawla and went over to the Fatimids. The Fatimids supplied him with an army, with which he attacked Aleppo in September. Sa'd al-Dawla was forced to appeal to the Byzantine emperor Basil II for help, and the Fatimid siege was raised by an army under Bardas Phokas the Younger. The Byzantines then proceeded to sack Homs in October. The city was returned to Hamdanid control, while Bakjur fled to Fatimid territory.

Bakjur now appealed to al-Aziz, and requested the governorship of Damascus. This request produced a rift between the Caliph al-Aziz, who favoured expansion in Syria and saw in Bakjur a tool for capturing Aleppo, and his long-serving vizier, Yaqub ibn Killis, who was opposed to this policy and moreover wished to maintain the incumbent governor, Baltakin, a protégé of his. Powerful interests within the city, especially the Jews under Manasseh ibn al-Qazzaz, and the Turkish military establishment also opposed Bakjur's appointment due to his relation with the local Arab tribal leaders, particularly the Banu Tayy under Mufarrij ibn Daghfal. In the end, al-Aziz overrode any objections and ordered the city handed over to Bakjur (December 983).

Bakjur's tenure in Damascus was troubled due to the opposition he faced, and the brutal measures with which he repressed it made him unpopular. Already soon after his assumption of the governorship he executed one of Manasseh ibn al-Qazzaz's Jewish supporters, while in 987 a plot, sponsored by Ibn Killis, to unseat him resulted in a wholesale slaughter of Bakjur's opponents in the city. Finally, in spring 988 Ibn Killis persuaded al-Aziz to depose Bakjur, and dispatched an army under Munis against Damascus. Bakjur and his Arab ally Mufarrij skirmished with Munis' Fatimid troops and their Arab tribal allies for about two months, before Munis scored a major success at a battle in Dariya, south-east of Damascus. Disheartened, Bakjur obtained a promise of pardon and free passage, and left for Raqqa on the Euphrates on 29 October. He was replaced by another of the protégés of Ibn Killis, the ghulam Ya'qub al-Siqlabi.

From Raqqa, he continued to plot against Sa'd al-Dawla, hoping to regain control of Aleppo. Sa'd al-Dawla, again with Byzantine assistance, was able to defeat and capture Bakjur at Na'ura east of Aleppo in April 991, and later had him executed.

== Sources ==
- Canard, Marius (1971). "Ḥamdānids". In Lewis, B.; Ménage, V. L.; Pellat, Ch. & Schacht, J. (eds.). The Encyclopaedia of Islam, Second Edition. Volume III: H–Iram. Leiden: E. J. Brill. pp. 126–131. OCLC 495469525.
- Gil, Moshe (1997) [1983]. A History of Palestine, 634–1099. Translated by Ethel Broido. Cambridge: Cambridge University Press. ISBN 0-521-59984-9.
- Kennedy, Hugh (2004) [1986]. The Prophet and the Age of the Caliphates: The Islamic Near East from the 6th to the 11th Century (Second ed.). Harlow: Longman. ISBN 978-0-582-40525-7.
- Stevenson, William B. (1926). "Chapter VI. Islam in Syria and Egypt (750–1100)". In Bury, John Bagnell (ed.). The Cambridge Medieval History, Volume V: Contest of Empire and Papacy. New York: The Macmillan Company. pp. 242–264.
