= Hamdanid dynasty =

Islamic state in northern Mesopotamia and Syria from 890 to 1004

Hamdanid Dynasty الحمدانيون al-Hamdaniyyun
- 890–1004
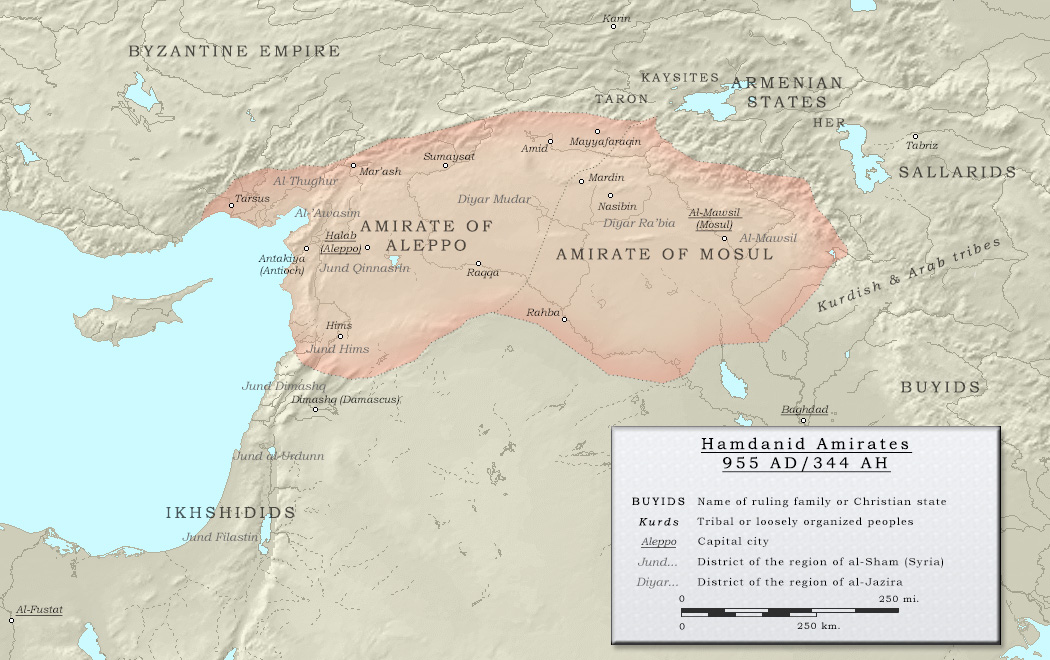
- Hamdanid territory in 955 during the rule of Sayf al-Dawla
- Capital: Mardin (892–895); Mosul (905–990) (in Iraq); Aleppo (944–1002) (in Syria)
- Common languages: Arabic
- Religion: Shia Islam
- Government: Emirate
- Historical era: Middle Ages
  - Established: 890
  - Husayn ibn Hamdan establishes himself as leader of Al-Jazira for the Abbasids.: 895
  - Sayf al-Dawla establishes himself in Aleppo after successfully countering the Ikhshidids of Egypt.: 944
  - Disestablished: 1004
Preceded by
Abbasid Caliphate
Succeeded by
Uqaylid dynasty
Fatimid Caliphate
Mirdasid dynasty

Family tree of the Hamdanid dynasty

The Hamdanid dynasty (Arabic: الحمدانيون, romanized: al-Ḥamdāniyyūn) was a Shia Muslim Arab dynasty that ruled Upper Mesopotamia and Syria (890–1004). They descended from the ancient Banu Taghlib tribe of Mesopotamia and Arabia.

== History ==
=== Origin ===
The Hamdanids hailed from the Arab Taghlib tribe, and are descendants of Adi ibn Usama al-Taghlibi. They're sometimes called Adawis or Taghlibis in historical sources.

=== Hamdanid emirate of Jazirah and Aleppo ===
The Hamdanid dynasty was founded by Hamdan ibn Hamdun. By 892–893, he was in possession of Mardin, after fighting the Kharijites of the Jazira. In 895, Caliph al-Mutadid invaded and Hamdan fled Mardin.

Hamdan's son, Husayn, who was at Ardumusht, joined the caliph's forces. Hamdan later surrendered to the caliph and was imprisoned. In December 908, Husayn conspired to establish Ibn al-Mu'tazz as Caliph. Having failed, Husayn fled until he asked for mediation through his brother Ibrahim. Upon his return, he was made governor of Diyar Rabi'a. In 916, Husayn, due to a disagreement with vizier Ali b. Isa, revolted, was captured, imprisoned, and executed in 918.

Hamdan's other son, Abdallah, was made governor of Mosul in 905–906. He conducted campaigns against the Kurds in that region and in 913–914, was dismissed from his post and subsequently revolted. Abdallah submitted himself to Mu'nis, and with his pardon was made governor of Mosul in 914–915. During his brother Husayn's revolt, both he and his brother Ibrahim were temporarily imprisoned. By 919, Abdallah was commanding an army against Yusuf b. Abi l'Sadj, governor of Adharbaydjan and Armenia. During their rule the Hamdanids intermarried with Kurdish dignitaries.

The rule of Hassan Nasir al-Dawla (929–968), governor of Mosul and Diyar Bakr, was sufficiently tyrannical to cause him to be deposed by his own family.

His lineage still ruled in Mosul, a heavy defeat by the Buyids in 979 notwithstanding, until 990. After this, their area of control in northern Iraq was divided between the Uqaylids and the Marwanids.

Ali Sayf al-Dawla 'Sword of the Dynasty' ruled (945–967) northern Syria from Aleppo, and became the most important opponent of the Christian Byzantine Empire's re-expansion. His court was a centre of culture, thanks to its nurturing of Arabic literature, but it lost this status after the Byzantine sacking of Aleppo.

To stop the Byzantine advance, Aleppo was put under the suzerainty of the Fatimids of Egypt, but in 1003 the Fatimids deposed the Hamdanids.

== Hamdanid rulers ==
Hamdanids in Al-Jazira

1. Hamdan ibn Hamdun
2. al-Husayn ibn Hamdan (895–916)
3. Abdallah ibn Hamdan (906–929)
4. Nasir al-Dawla (929–967)
5. Abu Taghlib (967–978)
6. Directly administered as part of the Buyid-controlled Abbasid Caliphate, 979–981
7. Abu Tahir Ibrahim ibn Nasir al-Dawla (989–990)
8. Abu Abdallah al-Husayn ibn Nasir al-Dawla (989–990)
9. Deposed by the Uqaylid chieftain Muhammad ibn al-Musayyab

Hamdanids in Aleppo

1. Sayf al-Dawla (945–967)
2. Sa'd al-Dawla (967–991)
3. Sa'id al-Dawla (991–1002)
4. Deposed by the ghulam Lu'lu' al-Kabir

== See also ==
- Rulers of Aleppo
- List of Shi'a Muslim dynasties
- Mirdasids
- Tarīkh Mayyāfāriqīn

== Sources ==
- Bosworth, C.E. (1996). The New Islamic Dynasties. Columbia University Press. "The Hamdanids came from the Arab tribe of Taghlib..[..]...the Hamdanids tended to follow the Shī'ī inclinations..."
- Canard, Marius (1971). "Ḥamdānids". In Lewis, B.; Ménage, V. L.; Pellat, Ch. & Schacht, J. (eds.). The Encyclopaedia of Islam, Second Edition. Volume III: H–Iram. Leiden: E. J. Brill. pp. 126–131. OCLC 495469525.
- Corbin, Henry (2014). History Of Islamic Philosophy. Routledge.
