= Marius Canard =

French Orientalist and historian (1888–1982)

- Born: December 26, 1888; Dracy-Saint-Loup, France
- Died: September 13, 1982 (aged 93); Duingt, Haute-Savoie
- Occupation: Historian
- Years active: 1913-1961

Marius Canard FBA (26 December 1888 – 13 September 1982) was a French Orientalist and historian.

== Biography ==
He was born in a small village in the region of Morvan, where his father was a school teacher. Canard studied at the Collège Bonaparte in Autun and completed his studies in the Faculty of Letters of the University of Lyon, where he learned the Arabic, Turkish and Persian languages under the guidance of his coeval Gaston Wiet (1887–1971).

His first teaching post was as a high school professor at Toulon in 1913. During the First World War, he served with the 16th Chasseurs à cheval Regiment stationed at Beaune, and was decorated with the Croix de Guerre with a silver star. After the war, he went to Morocco, where he perfected his knowledge of Arabic. In 1920 he returned to Lyon, where he taught in the Lycée du Parc. In order to further his language skills, he re-entered the local university's Faculty of Letters to learn Sanskrit.

Canard then visited the École des Langues Orientales (now known as INALCO) in Paris, where he came to know both William Marçais (1872–1956), and Georges Marçais (1876–1962). The latter convinced Canard to return to the Maghreb, first as a teacher in the Lycée de Tunis and then as a professor in the Faculty of Letters of the University of Algiers. It was there that Canard, along with Georges Marçais, founded the Institut d'Études Orientales and began a journal that soon acquired international prominence among Orientalists: the Annales.

After 44 years of teaching in Algiers, Canard retired in 1961 to Paris. He died in Duingt in 1982.

== Work ==
Among Canard's major scholarly achievements are his history of the Hamdanid dynasty, as well as his studies on the Fatimid Caliphate, a field which at the time was otherwise the almost exclusive reserve of Vladimir Alexeyevich Ivanov (1886–1970). He also made important contributions on the history of Muslim relations with the Byzantine Empire, and along with the Belgian Henri Grégoire (1881–1964) supervised the French edition of Alexander Vasiliev's (1867–1953) monumental Byzantium and the Arabs (Византия и арабы).

=== Main publications ===
- "Les expéditions des Arabes contre Constantinople dans l'histoire et dans la légende", in: Journal Asiatique, 208 (1926), pp. 61–121.
- "Les relations diplomatiques entre Byzance et l'Égypte dans le Ṣubḥ al-Aʿshā de Qalqashandī", Atti del XIX Congresso Internazionale degli orientalisti, Rome, 1935, pp. 579–580.
- Noumerous entries for The Encyclopaedia of Islam.
- "Quelques ‘à coté' de l'histoire des relations entre Byzance et les Arabes", in: Studi orientalistici in onore di Giorgio Levi Della Vida, Rome, Istituto per l'Oriente, 1956, vol. I, pp. 98–119.
- "Les principaux personnages du roman de chevalerie arabe Dhāt al-Himma wa-l-Baṭṭāl", in: Arabica, 8 (1961), pp. 158–173.
- Sayf al-Daula. Recueil de textes relatifs à l'émir Sayf al-Daula le Hamdanide, avec annotations, édité par M. Canard (Bibliotheca Arabica, VIII), Algiers, J. Carbonel, 1934, 484 pp.
- "Une lettre du calife fāṭimide al-Ḥāfiẓ (524-544/1130-1149) à Roger II", in: Atti del Convegno Internazionale di Studi Ruggeriani, Palermo, 1955, vol. I, pp. 125–146
- "Quelques notes relatives à la Sicile sous les premiers califes fatimides", in: Studi medievali in onore di Antonio De Stefano, Palermo, 1956, vol. I, pp. 125–146.
- "La relation du voyage d'Ibn Faḍlān chez les Bulgares de la Volga", in: Annales de l'Institut d'Etudes Orientales de l'Université d'Alger (AIEO), 16 (1958), pp. 41–146.
- "Ibrāhīm b. Yaʿqūb et sa relation de voyage en Europe", in: Études d'Orientalisme dédiées à la mémoire de Lévi-Provençal, Paris, 1962, vol. 2, pp. 503–508.
- "Fāṭimides et Būrides à l'époque du calife al-Ḥāfiẓ li-Dīni-llāh", su: Revue des Études Islamiques, 35 (1967), pp. 103–117.

== Sources ==
- F. Daftary "Marius Canard (1888-1982): A Bio-Bibliographical Notice", in: Arabica, XXXIII (1986), 2, pp. 251–262.
- M. Lefort, "Index de l'oeuvre historique de M. Canard", in: Arabica XXII (1975), pp. 180–211.
- "Professor Marius Canard FBA". British Academy.
