= Siege of Aleppo (994–995) =

Siege by the Fatimid Caliphate

- Part of the Arab–Byzantine wars
- The Arab–Byzantine frontier zone
Date	Spring 994 – April 995
Location	Aleppo
Result	Byzantine–Hamdanid victory

Belligerents
Hamdanid Emirate of Aleppo; Byzantine Empire	Fatimid Caliphate

Commanders and leaders
Lu'lu' al-Kabir; Michael Bourtzes; Basil II	Manjutakin

The siege of Aleppo was a siege of the Hamdanid capital Aleppo by the army of the Fatimid Caliphate under Manjutakin from the spring of 994 to April 995. Manjutakin laid siege to the city over the winter, while the population of Aleppo starved and suffered from disease. In the spring of 995, the emir of Aleppo appealed for help from Byzantine emperor Basil II. The arrival of a Byzantine relief army under the emperor in April 995 compelled the Fatimid forces to give up the siege and retreat south.

== Background ==
On 28 October 969, the Byzantine Empire reconquered the city of Antioch after an eleven-month siege. To give more strategic depth to the new possession, the Byzantine general Peter advanced on the Hamdanid capital city of Aleppo. After a 27-day siege, the Hamdanids surrendered in January 970 and agreed to become a Byzantine client state in the Treaty of Safar.

At the same time, the Fatimid Caliphate seized control of Egypt in 969 and adopted a policy of securing the Levant as a buffer state against a northeastern invasion of Egypt and to advance their claims to leadership over the Muslim world, replacing the Abbasid Caliphate. An immediate conflict between the Byzantine Empire and the Fatimids was avoided because each side saw the other as a useful ally against the Abbasids, and because the Fatimids had trouble establishing their dominance over Syria.

By the 980s, the Fatimids had subdued most of Syria. The rationale for friendly relations between the Byzantines and Fatimids looked more untenable. For the Fatimids, Aleppo was a gateway for military operations against both the Abbasids to the east and the Byzantines to the north. For the Byzantines, retaining Aleppo as a buffer was vital to prevent the emergence of a strong Muslim state on its frontier that could directly threaten the Empire.

== Prelude ==
In 992, the Fatimids broke a 987 truce with the Byzantines and launched an invasion of the Hamdanid and Byzantine territories in Syria, inflicting major damage on them. Byzantine emperor Basil II sent the general Leo Melissenos to reinforce the Byzantine defences and launched an abortive naval operation against Fatimid Alexandria in May 993. These actions did not prevent the Fatimids from amassing a force strong enough to conquer Aleppo.

== Siege ==
As the Fatimids under general Manjutakin laid siege to Aleppo in the spring of 994, the Byzantine doux Michael Bourtzes led an army to relieve the city. He was defeated and his army destroyed at the Battle of the Orontes on 15 September 994, with 5,000 Byzantine soldiers killed. In the aftermath, Manjutakin took over the fortress of Azaz and the lands around Aleppo.

The Fatimids built a fortified village in front of Aleppo, replete with bazaars and baths, in which to quarter their soldiers for the winter. The population of Aleppo endured famine and disease as the months dragged on. The emir of Aleppo appealed to Basil II for aid, warning that should Aleppo fall, Antioch would be next in line. Basil II was busy campaigning against the Bulgarian Empire but recognized the importance of stability on the Byzantine eastern frontier. With a relief army in tow, he marched across Anatolia to Antioch in sixteen days, arriving in April 995. As the emperor's army approached Aleppo, Manjutakin burned his camp and promptly abandoned the siege.

== Aftermath ==
As the Fatimid army retreated south, desertions mounted and the civilian population suffered due to the depredations of the marauding soldiers. Basil II's army went on to restore the lands of the Hamdanids and mount a failed siege against Tripoli. He soon returned to Constantinople by way of Antioch, leaving the eastern frontier with modestly increased Byzantine territories and with Damian Dalassenos as the new doux of Antioch. The emperor rejected a suggestion from his brother Constantine to annex Aleppo.

== Bibliography ==
- Faraq, Wesam (January 1990). "The Aleppo question: a Byzantine-Fatimid conflict of interests in Northern Syria in the later tenth century A.D.". Byzantine and Modern Greek Studies. 14 (1). Birmingham: University of Birmingham: 44–60. doi:10.1179/byz.1990.14.1.44. S2CID 161098454.
