= Duchy of Antioch =

10th-11th centuries Byzantine Empire territory

Ducate of Antioch Δοῦκατον τῆς Ἀντιόχειας
- Roman province of the Byzantine Empire
- 970–1084/1182
- Duchy of Antioch in 1025, in dotted green
- Capital: Antioch
- Area
  - c. 975: 76,700 km^{2} (29,600 sq mi)
- Historical era: Middle Ages
  - Capture of Antioch: 28 October 969
  - Creation of Ducate: 970
  - Treaty of Safar: December 969/January 970
  - Seljuk Conquest: 1084
  - Crusader Conquest: 28 June 1098
  - Treaty of Devol: September 1108
  - Treaty of Antioch: 1137
  - Disestablished: 1182
Preceded by	Succeeded by
Emirate of Aleppo	Sultanate of Rum; Principality of Antioch

The Duchy or Ducate of Antioch was a Byzantine territory ruled by a doux (Ancient Greek: δούξ) also known as a katepano (Ancient Greek: κατεπάνω) appointed by and under the authority of the emperor. It was founded in 970 after the reconquest of Antioch by imperial troops and existed until December 1084, when Suleiman ibn Qutalmish (r. 1077–1086) of the Sultanate of Rum conquered the ducal capital. After the Treaty of Devol in 1108, the Crusader prince of Antioch was recognised by the emperor as the doux of Antioch, an agreement which continued intermittently until shortly after the death of Manuel I Komnenos in 1180.

== History ==
=== Background ===
The Hellenistic city of Antioch and the surrounding regions of Cilicia and Syria became provinces of the Roman Republic in 64 BC after the campaigns of Pompey the Great. Because of the strategic position of the city near the Persian border and its prestige as the former capital of the Seleucid Empire, Antioch served as an informal eastern capital of the Republic and later Empire. Under the Tetrarchy, the provinces became part of the Diocese of the East under the command of a vicarius stationed in Antioch. In 535, the emperor Justinian I abolished the Diocese and the region was directly integrated into the Praetorian Prefecture of the East, commanded from Constantinople.

In 634 the Rashidun Caliphate launched an invasion of the Byzantine empire and by 638 the entirety of the former diocese had been conquered. Antioch and Cilicia then became part of the frontier zone between the Caliphate and the Empire. In order to effectively deal with the Caliphate the Praetorian Prefecture of the East, now all that was left of the empire outside of Italy, was abolished and the thematic system established in its stead.

Arab-Byzantine frontier in 780

=== Conquest ===
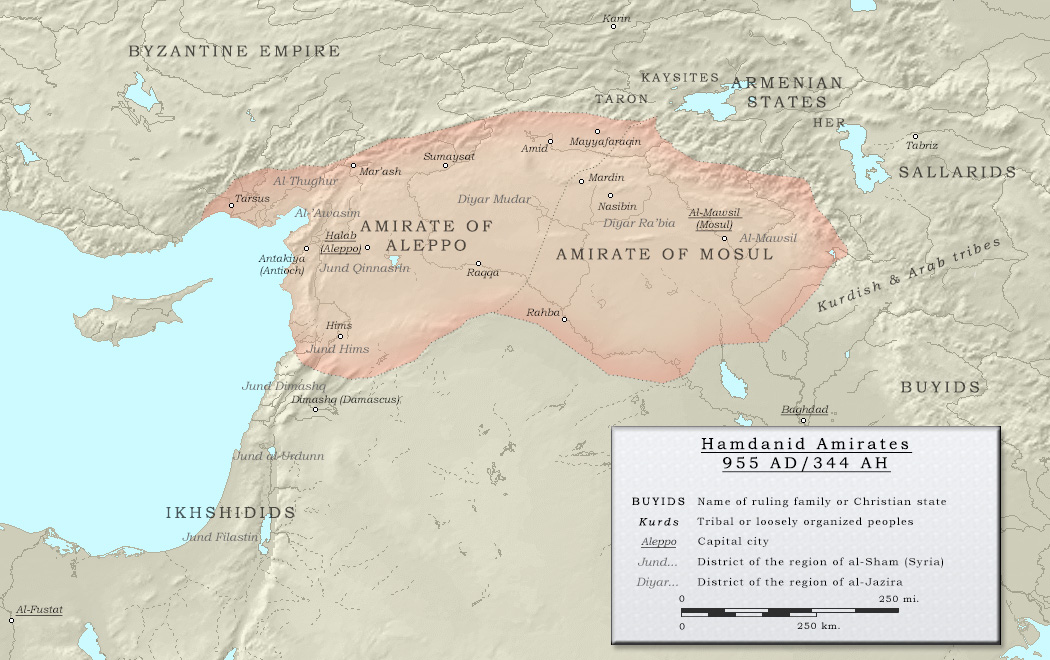
The domain of Sayf al-Dawla in Aleppo and his brother Nasir al-Dawla in Mosul c. 935.

Byzantine themes c. 950, before the conquest of Cilicia.

After the Anarchy at Samarra (861–870), the Abbasid Caliphate began to lose effective control of many of the emirates, which became only nominally subordinate to the Caliph but acted virtually independently. In 944, the Hamdanid warlord Sayf al-Dawla established himself as emir of Aleppo, controlling Antioch and the rest of the Byzantine frontier zone. For the next two decades, al-Dawla and the Phokades campaigned against one another. Eventually, the Byzantines prevailed and in 965 Cilicia was conquered by the emperor Nikephoros II Phokas, and was divided into minor themes including Tarsus, Mopsuestia, Padyandus and Anabarza.

After Sayf al-Dawla's death in 967, the Hamdanid position almost completely collapsed from Byzantine pressure. In October 969 after 363 years of Muslim rule, Antioch was conquered by Michael Bourtzes, the strategos of the neighbouring theme of Mauron Oros. Because Bourtzes had disobeyed the emeprors' orders, Bourtzes was recalled to Constantinople and Antioch was placed under the authority of Eustathios Maleinos, a cousin of the emperor and strategos of Lykandos, whilst the rest of the imperial army advanced towards Aleppo. Later that year, Aleppo was taken and the Treaty of Safar (December 969/January 970) was signed, establishing Byzantine control over the north-Syrian coast and Aleppo as a protectorate of the empire.

=== Creation and Expansion ===
Minor themes of the ducate of Antioch c. 975, overlaid on modern borders

Whilst the treaty was being negotiated, Phokas was assassinated by his nephew and successor John I Tzimiskes and aided by a disgruntled Bourtzes. As a reward, Bourtzes was appointed the first doux of Antioch later in 970, which had jurisdiction over all the minor themes established in Cilicia, and Syria to the south. Among them was the Theme of Tarsus, with a cavalry staff, as well as others that likely also had armies composed of horsemen. In 974 and 975, Tzimiskes campaigned in person against the Fatimids, creating more minor themes from newly conquered cities which were incorporated into the ducate. For a time, the ducate stretched as far south as the theme of Balaneos in the Golan Heights.

The following year, Tzimiskes died and the new emperor Basil II (r. 976–1025) again made Michael Bourtzes, the conqueror of Antioch, doux. He held office for only a few months until he allied himself with Bardas Skleros who was in revolt against Basil's authority. In 989, Bourtzes was again appointed as doux, a position he held until 995 when he was removed by continuous defeats in the face of the Arab onslaught, especially at the Battle of the Orontes. The next duke was Damian Dalassenos, who held office until July 19, 998, when he was defeated and killed by Fatimid troops at the Battle of Apamea.

Upon Damian's death, Nikephoros Ouranos, a general who made a career against the First Bulgarian Empire, was appointed to the post of duke of Antioch. Alongside Basil, he carried out a series of military expeditions aimed at appeasing the province, while also assisting in the expansion of the imperial borders toward the Kingdom of the Iberians. As an imperial representative, he acquired full powers of command of the troops stationed on the eastern frontier and, according to a seal of his, was appointed as "lord of the East."

Byzantium in 1025

=== Decline ===
After a succession of little-known dukes, the next prominent incumbent was Constantine Dalassenos, son of Damian Dalassenos, who held the post between 1024 and 1025. In 1055, Katakalon Kekaumenos was appointed to the position, and later Nikephoritzes (1061-1063), the future minister of Emperor Michael VII Dukas (r. 1071–1078). In 1071, after the decisive Battle of Manzikert against the Seljuk Turks, Joseph Tarchaneiotes was appointed as the new local governor. For the next seven years, Antioch would experience a series of popular uprisings, only subdued by Isaac Komnenos.

Domain of Philaretos Brachamios, the last Byzantine doux of Antioch

Parallel to the troubles in Antioch, Philaretos Brachamios revolted against the imperial authority and assumed the title of emperor upon the death of Romanos IV Diogenes (r. 1068–1071), who had been defeated at Manzikert by the Seljukids. In 1078, Nikephoros III Botaneiates (r. 1078–1081), ceded the office of duke to Philaretos in exchange for giving up the imperial claim. He was the last duke of Antioch, holding the post until December 1084, when Suleiman ibn Qutalmish (r. 1077–1086), from the Sultanate of Rum, conquered the ducal capital.

== Crusader Ducate ==
=== The First Crusade ===
In 1095, the emperor Alexios I Komnenos requested aid from the Latin West in reconquering Anatolia from the Sultanate of Rum. This led to the formation of the First Crusade, whose leaders initially promised to handover conquered territories to Alexios. However, distrust of the emperor at the siege of Antioch lead to the conquest of the city by Bohemond of Hauteville, who refused to hand over the city, arguing that Alexios' supposed betrayal at the siege had made the crusader oaths invalid. The other crusaders reluctantly accepted Bohemond's rule over Antioch and over the next decade Bohemond and his nephew Tancred campaigned against both Byzantines and Seljuks in Cilicia and Syria, greatly expanding their domain. Alexios refused to accept Bohemond as ruler of an independent Antioch, as he viewed Bohemond as breaking his oath by not handing over the lands which were formerly part of the ducate. In 1107 Bohemond attempted a large-scale invasion of the empire but his failure of the Siege of Dyrrhachium forced Bohemond to come to terms with the emperor.

=== Treaty of Devol (1108) ===
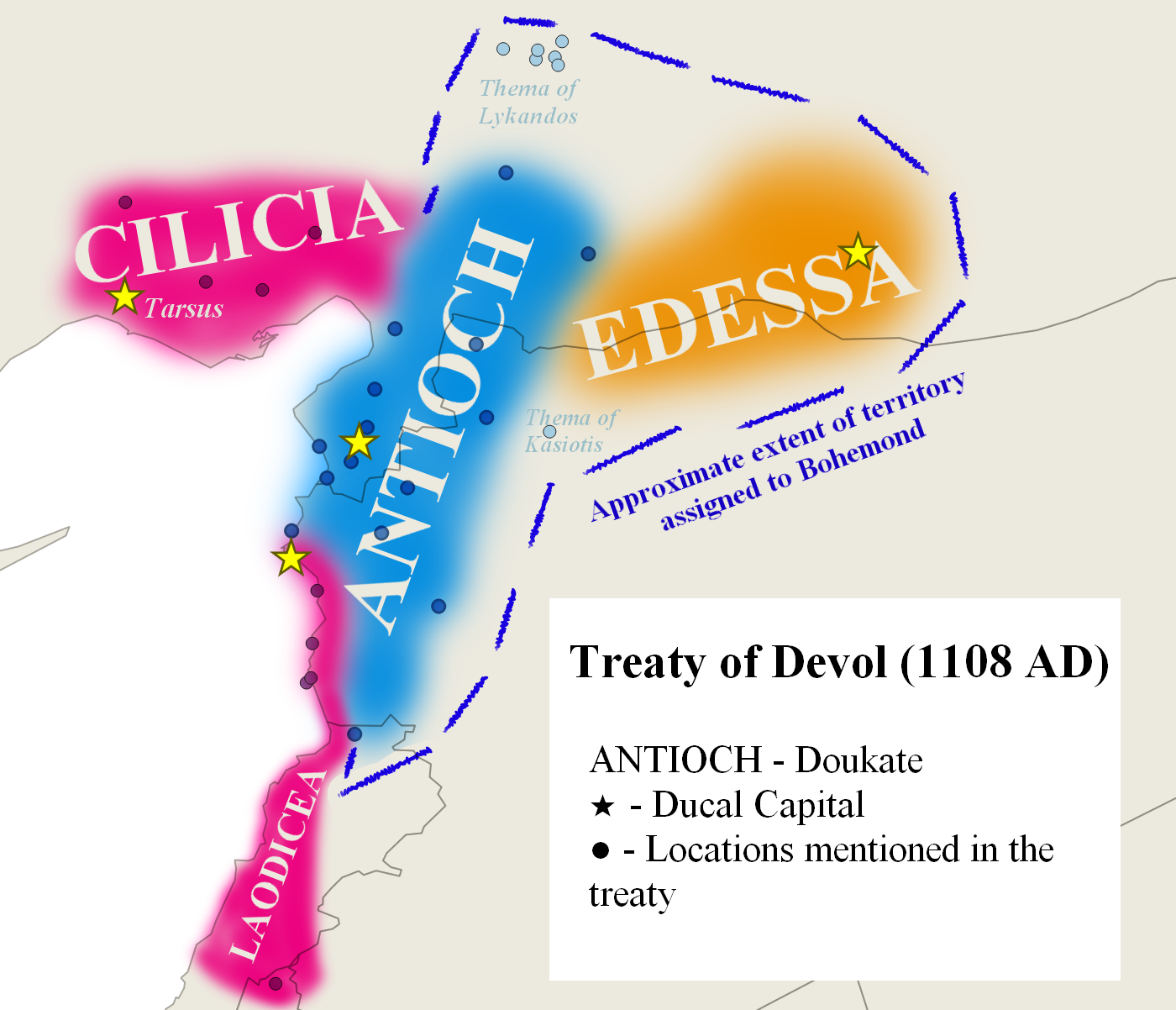
New borders of the Ducate of Antioch after the Treaty of Devol

In the resulting Treaty of Devol Bohemond became a vassal of Alexios and was granted the honorary title of Sebastos. Alexios formally recognised Bohemond's possession of Antioch by appointing him nonhereditary doux of Antioch and Edessa (then under the control of Tancred).^{α} The treaty divided the former ducate into three: Bohemond retained the core lands around Antioch, whilst Cilica in the north and Laodicea in the south were to become their own ducates under direct imperial control. As compensation, Bohemond was granted lands in eastern Syria and Mesopotamia currently outside of imperial and crusader control.

Bohemond promised in the treaty that he would ensure Tancred also agreed to the terms, even by force if necessary. Bohemond and Alexios' plan was that upon Bohemond's death the ducate of Antioch would revert to the empire and Edessa would remain under Tancred. However, Bohemond never returned to Antioch to properly implement the treaty, dying in Italy in 1111. Tancred, expelled from Edessa in 1109, refused to accept the treaty as he would be left landless without Antioch. Alexios was unable to get Tancred to accept the treaty by force before Tancred's death in 1112, and the emperor's own death in 1118 left the status of the ducate an open question.

=== John Komnenos ===
At Devol, Bohemond had pleged allegiance not just to Alexios but also his son and co-emperor John II Komnenos, who now succeeded his father as senior emperor. Early on his reign, John appears to have conceived a plan for inheriting the ducate through a marriage alliance. In 1118/1119, the emperor proposed a marriage between a daughter of the regent of Antioch, Roger of Salerno and his son and co-emperor Alexios. However, the death of Roger in 1119 and the imprisonment of his successor Baldwin II of Jerusalem in 1123 meant the marriage never took place.^{β}

The crusader states in 1135 before John Komnenos's campaigns. Cilicia would be directly annexed, and Edessa and Antioch turned into imperial subjects.

After Bohemond's son Bohemond II of Antioch died in 1130 leaving the ducate to his infant daughter Constance of Antioch, negotiations again resumed this time for marriage between his youngest son the sebastokrator Manuel and Constance. This was spurred on by John's plan to divide the empire amongst his four sons, with Manuel ruling the lands of the original ducate as well as Cyprus and Antalya.^{γ} Ultimately, John's plans were frustrated and Constance instead married Raymond of Poitiers in 1336.

The following year John campaigned against the Armenian Kingdom Cilicia who had entered into an anti-imperial alliance with Raymond. After re-establishing control over Cilicia, John moved south, permanently annexing the Antochian lands north of the Syrian Gates. Finally, Antioch was put under imperial blockade. Raymond was eventually pressured to meet John in person and a new agreement was made re-asserting Byzantine vassalage over Antioch. Raymond promised to cede the ducate to John upon the planned conquest of Aleppo and surrounding cities which in turn would be ruled by Raymond. In 1118, John campaigned with Raymond in Syria in order to fulfill the treaty by conquering the territories promised to Raymond. Forts and minor cities were captured, with Atarib and Kafartab granted to the principality, however Aleppo could not be taken so Raymond was not obliged to hand over Antioch to the emperor.

In 1142, Raymond requested imperial aid against Imad al-Din Zengi in Aleppo and John obliged, seeing a campaign as another opportunity for acquiring the ducate. He arrived in the region in Autumn and demanded Raymond hand over Antioch in order to secure the conquest of Aleppo for Raymond, but the Antiochians refused. As it was too late in the year for a campaign against either Antioch or Aleppo, John was forced to accept this temporary refusal until the next year, however the emperor died in April 1143.

=== Manuel Komnenos ===
Manuel succeeded his father and would eventually secure a more enduring agreement with the Antiochian princes. Manuel, who was with John in Cilicia, had to abandon his father's planned campaign in order to secure his ascension to the throne by hurrying back to Constantinople, so Antioch remained under Raymond's control. However, after the Fall of Edessa (1144), Raymond visited Constantinople and paid homage to the emperor in person, confirming his status as an imperial subject.^{δ} In 1158, Manuel visited Antioch in triumph and the new prince Raynald of Châtillon again submitted to the emperor. Imperial suzerainty was then cemented by Manuel's marriage to Raynald's step-daughter Maria of Antioch in 1161, and the marriage of Manuel's grandniece Theodora Komnene to Raynald's step-son Bohemond III of Antioch in 1177.

Manuel died in 1180, succeeded by his and Maria's young son Alexios II Komnenos. With an Antiochian princess as regent and a half-Antiochian emperor on the throne, there was hope for a final Byzantine-Antiochian union. However, in a wave of anti-Latin sentiment, Manuel's cousin Andronikos I Komnenos murdered both Maria and Alexios and took the throne. Although Bohemond had divorced Theodora soon after Manuel's death, with the murder of his sister Bohemond broke all ties with the empire and campaigned against imperial holdings in Cilicia. The subsequent two decades of chaos within the empire meant that Byzantium was never again in a position to force vassalage upon the Antiochians.

== Governors of Antioch ==
Doux	Term of office		Notes	Titles
Byzantine Antioch
Appointed by Nikephoros II Phokas (963–969)
Eustathios Maleinos	969	970	Strategos of Lykandos given temporary authority over Antioch; Appointed strategos of Tarsos upon creation of ducate	Strategos of Antioch and Lykandos
Appointed by John I Tzimiskes (969–976)
Michael Bourtzes	970		Conquered Antioch in 969	Proedros
Appointed by Basil II (976–1025)
Michael Bourtzes	976		Second Appointment	Proedros
Leo Melissenos	985	986		
Bardas Phokas the Younger	986	987	De jure Doux of the East, de facto Doux of Antioch; Rebelled in 987	Doux of the East
Leo Phokas the Younger	987	989		
Romanos Skleros?	c. 990	c. 991		
Michael Bourtzes	c. 989	995	Third Appointment; Dismissed after defeat at the Battle of the Orontes (994)	Proedros
Damian Dalassenos	995	998	Killed in action at the Battle of Apamea (998)	Doux of the East Patrikios or Magistros
Nikephoros Ouranos	998	1007 /1011	Imperial viceroy of the east stationed at Antioch	Krator of the East Magistros
Pankratios	c. 1000			Protospatharios
Michael	1011			Koitonites
Constantine Dalassenos	1024	1025	Son of Damian	Patrikios
Appointed by Constantine VIII (1025–1028)
Michael Spondyles	1026	1029	Defeated by the Mirdasid emir of Aleppo	Patrikios
Appointed by Romanos III Argyros (1028–1034)
Pothos Argyros	c. 1029			
Constantine Karantenos	1029	1030		Patrikios
Niketas of Mistheia	Autumn 1030	1032		Patrikios Rector
Theophylact Dalassenos	c. 1032	c. 1034	Son of Damian	Anthypatos Patrikios Vestes
Appointed by Michael IV (1034–1041)
Niketas	1034		Brother of Michael IV	Proedros
Leo	c. 1037			Anthypatos Patrikios Vestes
Constantine	1037/1038		Brother of Michael IV	
Basil Pediadites	c. 1038	c. 1041		Vestes
Stephen	c. 1040			Vestarches
Appointed by Constantine IX Monomachos (1042–1055)
Gregory	c. 1042	c. 1054		Vestarches
Michael Iasites	c. 1047			Magistros
Michael Kontostephanos	c. 1055			Kouropalates
Constantine Bourtzes		c. 1052		Magistros
Romanos Skleros	c. 1054	c. 1055		Proedros
Appointed by Theodora Porphryogentia (1055–1056)
Katakalon Kekaumenos	c. 1056			Magistros
Appointed by Michael VI Bringas (1056–1057)
Michael "Ouranos"	1056	1057	Nephew of Michael VI; Given the epithet Ouranos ('Heaven') by the emperor in imitation of the previous doux Nikephoros Ouranos	Magistros
Appointed by Isaac I Komnenos (1057–1059)
Romanos Skleros	c. 1057	c. 1058	Reinstated as doux by Isaac as reward for loyalty	Stratopedarches of the East Proedros
Adrianos	1059			
Appointed by Constantine X Doukas (1059–1067)
Nikephoros Botaneiates	c. 1060	c. 1061	Joint command of Antioch and Edessa	Doux of Antioch and Edessa Magistros Vestarches
Nikephoritzes	1062	1063		Sebastophoros
Bekh	c. 1065			
John	c. 1060s			
Nikephoritzes	1067		Second Appointment	Sebastophoros
Nikephoros Botaneiates	1067	1068	Second Appointment	Proedros
Appointed by Romanos IV Diogenes (1068–1071)
Peter Libellisios	1068	1069		Magistros
Constantine	c. 1069			Protokouropalates
Chatatourios	c. 1069	1072 (disputed)	Defected to Romanos IV during the civil war following the Battle of Manzikert (1071); Killed in Action against Andronikos Doukas (1072)	
Appointed by Michael VII Doukas (1071–1078)
Joseph Tarchaneiotes	1072	1074		Proedros
Katakalon Tarchaneiotes	1074		Son of Joseph	
Isaac Komnenos (c. 1050–1102/1104)	1074	1078		Domestic of the Schools of the East Protopedros
Michael Maurex	c. 1078			Kouropalates
Vasakios Pahlavouni	c. 1078			
Appointed by Nikephoros III (1078–1081)
Philaretos Brachamios	1078/1079	1084	Antioch conquered by Suleiman ibn Qutalmish (1084); Seljuk vassal of Germanicea (1086)	Domestic of the Schools of the East Protosebastos
Crusader Antioch
Recognised by Alexios I Komnenos (1081–1118)
Bohemond I of Antioch (c. 1054–1111)	de facto 1098 de jure 1108	1111	Conquered Antioch from the Seljuk and established the Principality of Antioch (1098); Recognised as doux of Antioch and Edessa under the Treaty of Devol (1108)	Prince of Antioch Sebastos
Bohemond II of Antioch (c. 1107–1130)	1111	1130	Regents refused to ratify the treaty of Devol; Never acknowledged imperial rule over Antioch	Prince of Antioch
Recognised by John II Komnenos (1118–1143)
Raymond of Poitiers (c. 1105–1149)	1137	1149	Husband of Constance of Antioch, daughter of Bohemond II; Treaty of Antioch (1137); Treaty of Constantinople (1145)	Prince of Antioch
Recognised by Manuel I Komnenos (1143–1180)
Raynald of Châtillon (c. 1124–1187)	1153	1161/ 1162	Second husband of Constance of Antioch; Treaty of Mopsuestia (1158); Married step-daughter to Manuel I Komnenos (1161)	Prince of Antioch
Bohemond III of Antioch (c. 1148–1201)	1163	1082	Son of Constance and Raymond; Married grand-niece of Manuel I (1177)	Prince of Antioch

== Notes ==
^α The treaty stipulated that Bohemond had the right to bequeath the ducate of Edessa to someone else provided they also became subjects of the emperor. It is likely that Alexios included this term in the treaty so that Bohemond could establish Tancred as the doux of Edessa. (Todt 2000, pp. 496–497)

^β The identity of the imperial bridegroom is unknown. The embassy is recorded by the English chronicler Orderic Vitalis who claims it was Alexios I wanting a bride for John II, but John at the time was already married to Irene of Hungary as were all of John's brothers, so it had to be one of John's sons. Orderic's confusion between Alexios I and his grandson, as well as Alexios being John's eldest son and co-emperor makes him the likely candidate. Moreover, Alexios' marriage to Dobrodeia of Kiev c. 1123 only after negotiations with Antioch failed also points to Alexios as the bridegroom.

^γ John Kinnamos (I.10) reports that Manuel was to receive Antioch, Cilicia, Cyprus and Attaleia without mention of John's other sons. An anonymous short chronicle assigns Rome to Alexios, Jerusalem to Andronikos, "elswhere" to Isaac and Manuel in Constantinople with John. Jerusalem implies Andronikos would rule over all the Crusader states, but whether Antioch would be included is unknown, as is the extent of Isaac and Manuel's domains. The assignment of Manuel to Constantinople rather than Antioch in the short chronicle likely is the rest of Manuel's propaganda justifying his ascession to the throne over his brothers.

^δ It is possible that during this visit Raymond was officially recognised by Manuel as Prince of Antioch (Ancient Greek: πριγκιπάτον Ἀντιοχείας), as Byzantine chronicles from Manuels' reign refer to Raymond and his successors as such.

== Bibliography ==
Primary Sources

- Anna Komnene. Alexiad trans. E. A. S. Dawes. Routledge 1928.
- John Kinnamos. Deeds of John and Manuel Komnenos trans. C. M. Brand. New York 1976.

Secondary Sources

- Asbridge, Thomas S. (2000). The creation of the Principality of Antioch : 1098–1130. The Boydell Press.
- Buck, Andrew D. (2017) The Principality of Antioch and its Frontiers in the Twelfth Century Cambridge University Press.
- Finlay, George (1854). History of the Byzantine and Greek Empires from 1057 - 1453. Edinburgh: William Blackwood & Sons.
- Holmes, Catherine (2005). Basil II and the Governance of Empire (976–1025). Oxford: Oxford University Press. ISBN 978-0-19-927968-5.
- Kazhdan, Alexander Petrovich (1991). The Oxford Dictionary of Byzantium. Oxford: Oxford University Press. ISBN 0-19-504652-8.
- Lau, Maximilian C. G. (2023). Emperor John II Komnenos: Rebuilding New Rome 1118-1143. Oxford University Press. ISBN 978-0-19-888867-3.
- Magdalino, Paul (2003). Byzantium in the Year 1000. Leida: Brill. ISBN 90-04-12097-1.
- Nesbitt, John W.; Oikonomides, Nicolas (2005). Catalogue of Byzantine Seals at Dumbarton Oaks and in the Fogg Museum of Art: The East (continued), Constantinople and environs, unknown locations, addenda, uncertain readings. Washington: Dumbarton Oaks Research Library and Collection. ISBN 0-88402-226-9.
- Nicolle, David (1994). Yarmuk 636 A.D.: The Muslim Conquest of Syria. Oxford: Osprey Publishing. ISBN 9781855324145.
- Norwich, John Julius (1997). A Short History of Byzantium. New York: Vintage Books. ISBN 978-0-67-977269-9.
- Runciman, Steven (1951).The History of the Crusades Volume I: The First Crusade and the Foundation of the Kingdom of Jerusalem. Cambridge University Press.
- Salas, Brian William (2024). The Strategides and Themes: A Quantitative Approach to the Byzantine Empire's Administrative Structure. Unpublished PhD dissertation, University of Chicago.
- Todt, Klaus-Peter (2000). 'Antioch and Edessa in the so-called Treaty of Deabolis (September 1108),' ARAM Periodical 11-12, 1999-2000, pp. 485–501.
- Treadgold, Warren (1995). Byzantium and Its Army, 284–1081. Stanford: Stanford University Press. ISBN 0-8047-2420-2.
- Trombley, Frank (1997). "The Taktika of Nikephoros Ouranos and Military Encyclopaedism". In Binkley, Peter (ed.). Pre-Modern Encyclopaedic Texts: Proceedings of the Second COMERS Congress, Groningen, 1-4 July 1996. Brill. ISBN 978-90-04-10830-1.
- Whittow, Mark (1996). The Making of Byzantium, 600–1025. Berkeley e Los Angeles: University of California Press. ISBN 0-520-20496-4.
