= Katakalon Tarchaneiotes =

11th-century Byzantine official

- Occupations: Governor and General
- Title: Doux of Antioch Katepano of Adrianople Kouropalates

Katakalon Tarchaneiotes (Greek: Κατακαλών Ταρχανειώτης), mentioned in the works of Nikephoros Bryennios the Younger as Katakalon Katakalos (Κατακαλών Κατακαλός), was an 11th-century Byzantine official, active during the reigns of Michael VII Doukas (r. 1071–1078), Nikephoros III Botaneiates (r. 1078–1081) and Alexios I Komnenos (r. 1081–1118).

He first appeared in 1074, when he replaced his father as Duke (dux) of Antioch and confronted the revolt of Philaretos Brachamios, though without success. Years later, as Katepano of Adrianople (now Edirne), he initially confronted the revolt of Nikephoros Bryennios the Elder but ended up allying with him and taking part in the Battle of Kalavrye. In 1094, he attended the Council of Blachernae (1094), and in 1095, defended Adrianople during a Cuman invasion.

== Life ==
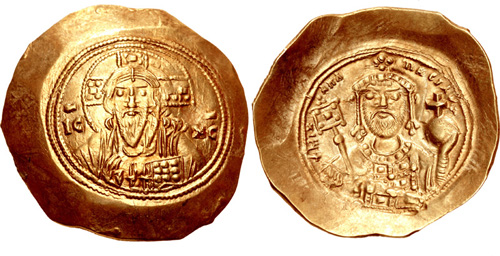
Michaelaton (Histamenon) of Michael VII Doukas (r. 1071–1078)

Katakalon Tarchaneiotes was the son of Joseph Tarchaneiotes, Duke (dux) of Antioch. He was first mentioned in 1074, the year of his father's death and his rise as a duke, as well as the revolt of Philaretos Brachamios. Katakalon attempted to confront the rebels but was unable to stop them, and Philaretos managed to gather large Armenian contingents and other soldiers into a large army, which he used to expand his domains at the expense of the cities of the Byzantine Empire.

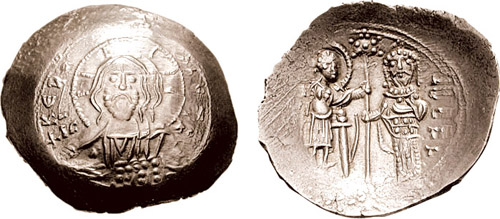
Histamenon of Alexios I Komnenos (r. 1081–1118)

In 1078, as Katepano of Adrianople, he opposed the uprising of Nikephoros Bryennios the Elder and his brother John Bryennios, and wrote to Emperor Michael VII and his minister Nikephoritzes requesting troops to suppress it. He received no assistance and had to resist the rebels alone for several days. Aware that he was risking himself for a small purpose, he allied himself with John Bryennios and joined the rebellion. This alliance was sealed by Cropalatess Anna, mother of the Bryennios, who arranged the marriage between Helen, Katakalon's sister, and John Bryennios' son. In this same year, Katakalon commanded the left wing of the army of Nikephoros Bryennios, which was composed of 3,000 knights from Thrace and Macedonia, during the Battle of Kalavrye against Alexios I Komnenos and the troops loyal to the new emperor, Nikephoros III Botaneiates.

According to a seal dated 1085, Katakalon was a kouropalates, and according to Nikephoros Bryennios the Younger, at an unknown date, he assumed the title of magistros. In 1093, Theophylact of Ohrid sent him two letters, one discussing attitudes to fortune, and the other with a small coin, as in the Parable of the talents or minas. There is a third letter sent to a Tarchaneiotes, but it is uncertain if it is to Katakalon. In 1094, he attended the council convened by Alexios I Komnenos (r. 1081–1118) in Blachernae to deliberate on the veneration of icons. According to the list of those present, Katakalon was a senator. In 1095, during an invasion by the Cumans, Katakalon and the then-blind Nikephoros Bryennios the Elder were tasked with the defense of Adrianople.

Katakalon Tarchaneiotes was widely praised in the sources that referred to him. According to Theophylact of Ohrid, Katakalon Tarchaneiotes was the most illustrious master, while according to Nikephoros Bryennios the Younger, he was a man distinguished for his manner of life, education, and skill in military affairs. According to the same author, while still young, Katakalon was wiser than any other and more prudent.
