= Muhammad ibn Isa =

Muhammad ibn Isa was a Khurasani warrior who came to Aleppo some time around the spring of 967 with around 5,000 soldiers in order to engage in a jihad against the Byzantine Empire. While the Byzantine emperor Nikephoros II Phokas was campaigning against the Bulgarians in the west, Isa managed to secure a victory against the Byzantines and advanced into Cilicia. Nikephoros sent Petros to challenge Isa, where he defeated him around Alexandretta in 968. Petros then ransomed Isa to the people of Antioch in exchange for Byzantine prisoners of war.

== Sources ==
- Kaldellis, Anthony (2017). Streams of Gold, Rivers of Blood: The Rise and Fall of Byzantium, 955 A.D. to the First Crusade. Oxford University Press. ISBN 978-0190253226.
- Lilie, Ralph-Johannes; Ludwig, Claudia; Pratsch, Thomas; Zielke, Beate (2013). Prosopographie der mittelbyzantinischen Zeit Online. Berlin-Brandenburgische Akademie der Wissenschaften. Nach Vorarbeiten F. Winkelmanns erstellt (in German). Berlin and Boston: De Gruyter.
