= Joseph Tarchaneiotes =

Byzantine general (d. 1074)

Joseph Tarchaneiotes (Greek: Ιωσήφ Ταρχανειώτης) was a Byzantine general primarily known for his lack of participation in the decisive Battle of Manzikert (1071).

== Biography ==
An experienced general, Joseph was second-in-command of the Byzantine operation at Manzikert, with some 30,000–40,000 soldiers under his command. Tarchaneiotes's segment of the army was detached to take nearby Khliat before the main battle took place. It is not clear what happened then, though in any case Khliat was not taken by the Byzantines. Tarchaneiotes's lack of participation in the campaign, whether due to treachery, dissatisfaction, or a defeat in battle, seriously undermined Romanos IV's (r. 1068 – 1071) ability to fight at Manzikert. Even though his detachment was either defeated (according to Seljuk sources) or eliminated by causes unknown (Byzantine sources do not mention it at all), Tarchaneiotes survived.

Joseph died in 1074, whilst serving as the doux of Antioch, and was succeeded by his son Katakalon Tarchaneiotes.

== Sources ==
- Kazhdan, Alexander, ed. (1991). The Oxford Dictionary of Byzantium. Oxford and New York: Oxford University Press. ISBN 0-19-504652-8.
- Norwich, John Julius (1997). A Short History of Byzantium. New York, New York: Vintage Books. ISBN 978-0-67-977269-9.
