= Manjutakin =

Late 10th-century Fatimid general

Manjutakin (Arabic: منجوتكين) was a military slave (ghulam) of the Fatimid Caliph al-Aziz (r. 975–996). Of Turkic origin, he became one of the leading Fatimid generals under al-Aziz, fighting against the Hamdanids and the Byzantines in Syria. He rebelled against the Berber-dominated regime of the early years of al-Hakim (r. 996–1021), but was defeated and died in captivity.

== Biography ==
Manjutakin was one of the most prominent of the Turkic slave-soldiers who were introduced to the Fatimid court by al-Aziz and his predecessor al-Mu'izz (r. 953–975) and favoured as a counterbalance to the predominantly Berber army (mostly drawn from the Kutama tribe).

In 991, after the death of the long-time vizier Yaqub ibn Killis, who had dominated Fatimid politics during his life, al-Aziz chose to pursue a more aggressive stance in Syria, and appointed Manjutakin as governor of Damascus. Encouraged by the defectors after the death of emir Sa'd al-Dawla, al-Aziz decided to renew his attacks on the Hamdanid emirate of Aleppo, and tasked Manjutakin with the campaign. The Fatimid general invaded the emirate, defeated a Byzantine force under the doux of Antioch, Michael Bourtzes, in June 992, and laid siege to Aleppo. However, he failed to pursue the siege with vigour and the city was easily able to resist until, in the spring of 993, after thirteen months of campaigning, Manjutakin was forced to return to Damascus due to lack of supplies. In spring 994, Manjutakin launched another invasion, again defeated Bourtzes at the Battle of the Orontes in September, took Homs, Apamea and Shayzar and besieged Aleppo. The blockade was far more effective this time and soon caused a severe lack of food, but the city's defenders held out under the determined guidance of the Hamdanids' de facto regent, Lu'lu', until the sudden arrival of the Byzantine emperor, Basil II, in person in April 995. Basil, who had been campaigning in Bulgaria, had responded to the Hamdanids' plea for aid, and crossed Asia Minor in only sixteen days at the head of an army; his sudden arrival, and the exaggerated numbers circulating for his army, caused panic in the Fatimid army, especially as Manjutakin, expecting no threat, had ordered his cavalry horses to be dispersed around the city for pasture. Despite having a considerably larger and well-rested army, Manjutakin was thus at a disadvantage. He burned his camp and retreated to Damascus without battle. The Byzantines besieged Tripoli unsuccessfully and occupied Tartus. Al-Aziz himself now prepared to take the field against the Byzantines himself, but he died on 14 October 996 before starting his campaign.

After al-Aziz's death, his young son al-Hakim succeeded to the throne. The Kutama, however, used the opportunity to install their leader, al-Hasan ibn 'Ammar, as prime minister, and to effectively seize control of the central government for themselves. This provoked the reaction of the Turkic faction, led by Manjutakin. With the covert encouragement of al-Hakim's eunuch tutor Barjawan, Manjutakin led his army south towards Egypt, while the Berbers gathered under the command of Sulayman ibn Ja'far ibn Fallah. The two armies met in either Ramla or Ascalon, and the battle ended in defeat for Manjutakin, who was taken prisoner. Ibn Fallah marched on to Damascus, where he assumed the post of governor, while Manjutakin himself was well received by Ibn 'Ammar, who thus hoped—in the event, without success—to reconcile the Turks to his regime and use them to counterbalance the caliphal office. He was allowed to live out his years in retirement in Cairo, where he died in 1007.

== See also ==
- Aziz al-Dawla, a ghulam (slave soldier) of Manjutakin who became the Fatimids' first governor of Aleppo.

== Sources ==
- Bianquis, Thierry (1986). Damas et la Syrie sous la domination fatimide (359-468/969-1076): essai d'interprétation de chroniques arabes médiévales. Tome premier (in French). Damascus: Institut français de Damas. ISBN 978-2-35159130-7.
- Kennedy, Hugh (2004) [1986]. The Prophet and the Age of the Caliphates: The Islamic Near East from the 6th to the 11th Century (Second ed.). Harlow: Longman. ISBN 978-0-582-40525-7.
- O'Leary, De Lacy (1923). A Short History of the Fatimid Khalifate. London: Kegan Paul, Trench, Trubner & Co. Limited.
- Stevenson, William B. (1926). "Chapter VI. Islam in Syria and Egypt (750–1100)". In Bury, John Bagnell (ed.). The Cambridge Medieval History, Volume V: Contest of Empire and Papacy. New York: The Macmillan Company. pp. 242–264.
- Whittow, Mark (1996). The Making of Byzantium, 600–1025. Berkeley and Los Angeles, California: University of California Press. ISBN 978-0-520-20496-6.
