= Siege of Antioch (968–969) =

Byzantine military offensive against the Hamdanid Dynasty

- Part of the Arab–Byzantine wars
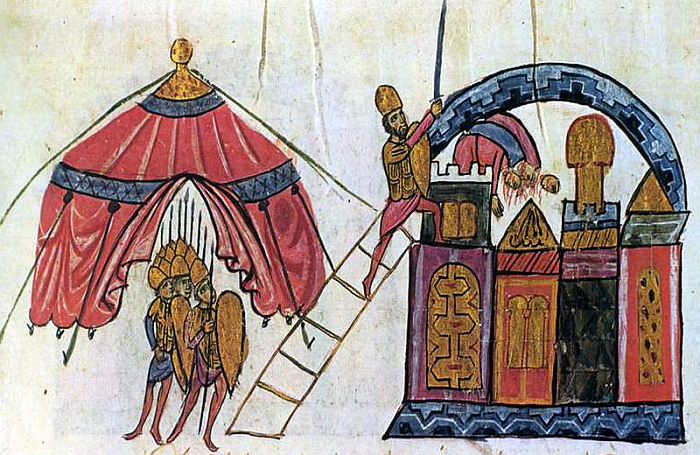
- Fall of Antioch in 969
Date	November 968 – 28 October 969
Location	Antioch, Hamdanid Dynasty (modern-day Antakya, Hatay, Turkey)
Result	Byzantine victory
Territorial changes	Antioch conquered and Re-Christianized by Byzantium

Belligerents
Hamdanid Dynasty	Byzantine Empire

Commanders and leaders
Aulax	Michael Bourtzes; Petros; Sachakios Brachamios

Strength
Garrison of Antioch	1,000 infantry 500 cavalry

Casualties and losses
Heavy	Light

The siege of Antioch in 968–969 was a successful military offensive undertaken by leading commanders of the Byzantine Empire in order to reconquer the strategically important city of Antioch from the Hamdanid Dynasty.

== Background ==
Nikephoros II Phokas’ second Syrian campaign reached Antioch on 19 October 968 but departed three days later on the road to Aleppo, but stopped at Ma’arrat Misrin, which the army seized and the population was deported to the empire. The army proceeded south, reaching Tripoli on 5 November but failed to take the city. The emperor and his troops then marched back to Antioch along the coast, and a note in Leo the Deacon suggests Nikephoros was still in Syria in mid-December. The Byzantine Emperor decided to return to Constantinople for the winter. Before leaving, however, he constructed the Bagras Fort near Antioch and installed Michael Bourtzes as its commander, instructing him and Petros to lay siege to Antioch. Bagras was too far from Antioch to be a direct siege camp, and instead was a communication hub guarding the Syrian Gates across the Amanos. The places captured by Nikephoros on the brief 968 Syrian campaign show a strategy to put pressure on Antioch by blockading its medium- and long-distance communications, and to stress the food supply by threatening the Amuq Plain.

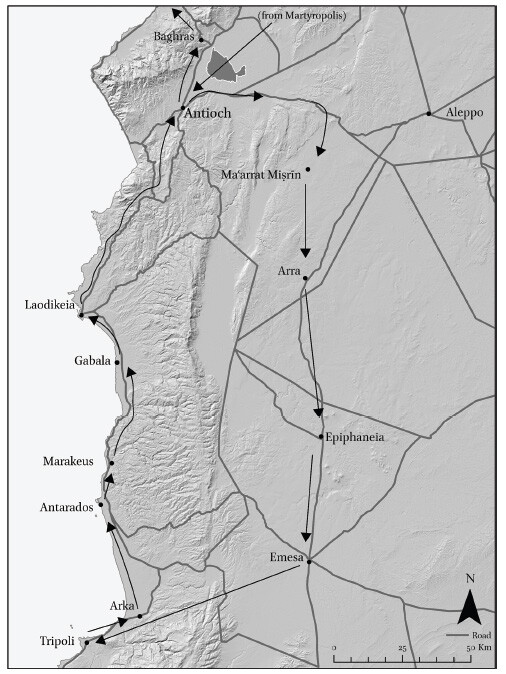
Syrian campaign of Nikephoros II Phokas, AD 968

== Siege ==
Nikephoros explicitly forbade Bourtzes from taking Antioch by force in order to maintain the structural integrity of the city. Bourtzes, however, did not want to wait until winter to take the fortress. He also wanted to impress Nikephoros and earn himself glory, and so he entered into negotiations with the defenders seeking terms for surrender. At this point, Petros was engaged in a raid on the surrounding countryside with the Syrian commander 'Ayšalš, where he probably first entered into communications with Qarquya. Here it is possible that Bourtzes entered into an alliance with Aulax, the commander of the "Kallas" towers. Supposedly, Aulax, in exchange for gifts and prestige, assisted Bourtzes in transporting him, his commander Sachakios Brachamios, and 300 men on top of the Kallas towers during the night; upon ascending the towers, the Byzantines were able to gain a foothold in the outer defenses of the city.

Bourtzes, now in control of the outer walls, sent a message to Petros recalling him to Antioch in order to take the city. At first, Petros was hesitant, remembering the emperor's orders not to take Antioch by force, but, as the requests from Bourtzes became more desperate and his men began to lose ground on the walls, he decided to return to Antioch to assist in taking the city. Petros approached the Kallas gates on 28 October, 969 and, upon witnessing his impending attack, the Antiochenes retreated and were defeated.

== Aftermath ==
Following the capture of Antioch, Bourtzes was removed from his position by Nikephoros due to his disobedience, and would go on to assist in a plot which would end in Nikephoros' assassination, while Petros would move deeper into Syrian territory, besieging and taking Aleppo itself and establishing the Byzantine Tributary of Aleppo through the Treaty of Safar.

== Sources ==
- Kaldellis, Anthony (2017). Streams of Gold, Rivers of Blood: The Rise and Fall of Byzantium, 955 A.D. to the First Crusade. Oxford University Press. ISBN 978-0190253226.
- Lilie, Ralph-Johannes; Ludwig, Claudia; Pratsch, Thomas; Zielke, Beate (2013). Prosopographie der mittelbyzantinischen Zeit Online. Berlin-Brandenburgische Akademie der Wissenschaften. Nach Vorarbeiten F. Winkelmanns erstellt (in German). Berlin and Boston: De Gruyter.
- McMahon, Lucas (2025). "Strangling Antioch: a Spatial Approach to Conquest". In Theotokis, Georgios; Tsurstumia, Mamuka (eds.). Nikephoros II Phokas and Warfare in the 10th-Century Byzantine World. History of Warfare. Vol. 152. Brill. pp. 78–108. ISBN 9789004724716.
- Romane, Julian (2015). Byzantium Triumphant. Pen and Sword Books. ISBN 978-1473845701.
