= Irhab, Syria =

Irhab أرحاب
- Town
- Location within Syria
- Coordinates: 36°12′15.98″N 36°50′52.73″E
- Country: Syria
- Governorate: Aleppo Governorate
- District: Mount Simeon District
- Nahiyah: Darat Izza Subdistrict

Population (2004 census)
  - Total: 110
- Time zone: UTC+2 (EET)
  - Summer (DST): UTC+3 (EEST)

Irhab (Arabic: أرحاب) is a village in northern Syria, administratively part of the Mount Simeon District of the Aleppo Governorate, located west of Aleppo. According to the Syria Central Bureau of Statistics (CBS), it had a population of 110 in the 2004 census.
