= Philaretos Brachamios =

Byzantine general and usurper

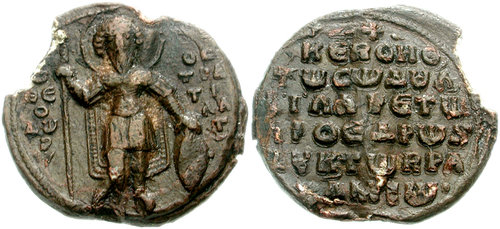
- Seal of Philaretos Brachamios, Protokouropalates and Domestic of the Scholae.

Protosebastos
- Domestic of the Schools of the East; 1078 – c. 1087
- Monarchs: Alexios I Komnenos; Nikephoros III Botaneiates

Kouropalates
- Doux of Antioch; 1078 – c. 1087
- Monarch: Nikephoros III Botaneiates
- Stratopedarches of the East c. 1069 – c. 1071
- Doux c. 1068 – c. 1069
- Monarch: Romanos IV Diogenes

Protospatharios Hypatos
- Topoteretes of Cappadocia c. 1060 – c. 1068
- Monarch: Constantine X Doukas

Personal details
- Born: c. 1030
- Died: c. 1087

Military service
- Allegiance: Byzantine Empire
- Years of service: c. 1060–c.1087

Philaretos Brachamios (Greek: Φιλάρετος Βραχάμιος; Armenian: Փիլարտոս Վահրամ Վարաժնունի, romanized: Pilartos Vahram Varajnuni; Latin: Philaretus Brachamius) was a distinguished Byzantine general and warlord of Armenian heritage. He was for a time the ruler of a quasi-independent state that refused to recognise Emperor Michael VII. Philaretos is attested on seals as taxiarches (commander of an infantry regiment), as well as protospatharios and topoteretes (deputy commander) of the Tagmata of Cappadocia, then as magistros and doux (duke), and finally as kouropalates and doux.

== Background ==
Since the 1060–1070s, the Armenian highlands and the Anti-Taurus Mountains had been exposed to Turkoman warriors and their rule, while the presence of local Christian lords in the region stretching from the Cilician plain to Diyar Mudar persisted.

== Career ==
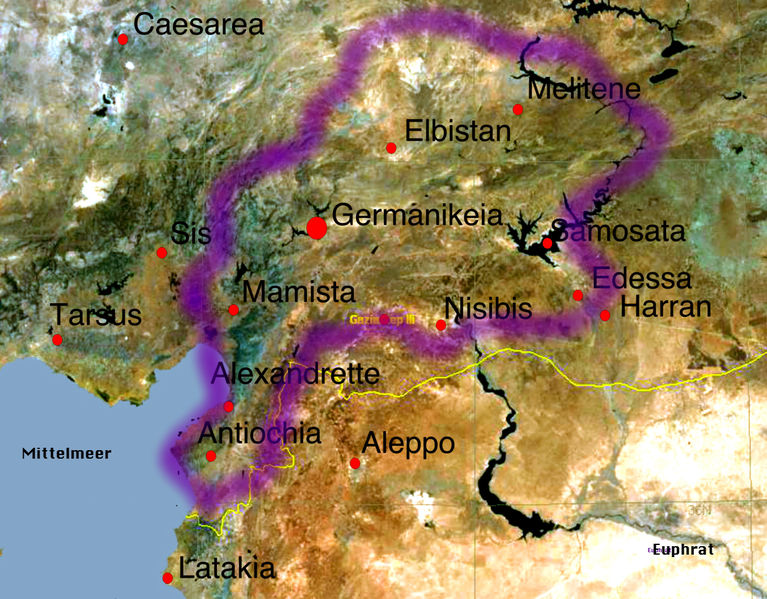
State controlled by Philaretos.

Philaretos is described by Michael the Syrian as having a "tough and robust character" while Matthew of Edessa saw him as a "lawless and most evil prince". Philaretos held a high command in the army of Romanus IV Diogenes. In 1069 he was given the command of the main Byzantine army that was protecting the frontier of Mesopotamia while Romanus participated in the siege of Akhlat. He was defeated by the Seljuk Turks who advanced deep into Cappadocia and Lycaonia and plundered at will before rapidly retreating with their spoils. He was present at the Battle of Manzikert in 1071, where he commanded a division of Romanus' army, and remained at the head of a considerable body of troops after the defeat.

In the aftermath of the battle, he commanded the forces of the fortress Romanopolis, and refused to recognise the authority of Michael VII Doukas. As the only remaining Byzantine general in the southeast he established a quasi-autonomous realm in the neighbourhood of Germanicia, which stretched from Cilicia to Edessa. The core of his army was composed of 8,000 "Franks" (Normans) under Raimbaud. In 1078, at the beginning of the rule of Nikephoros III Botaneiates, he agreed to abandon his imperial claims on condition that Botaneiates appoint him as the duke of Antioch, which included Edessa. Several seals testify him as megas domestikos and protokouropalates, then sebastos, then even protosebastos. Philaretos also tried to entice the Syriac Patriarch to restore the patriarchal seat to the Monastery of Bārid, but the patriarchs remained in Amid, their special diocese, and in the monastery of Mor Bar Sauma.

He retained his dukedom until the Turks began to press heavily upon him. In December 1084, he lost Antioch to Suleiman I, ruler of the Turks of Rum. In 1087, Edessa fell to Malik Shah and Philaretos escaped back to the fortress of Germanicia; however, some sources indicate that he died in 1086. He was the last well-known Domestic of the Schools of the East. His sons handed Germanicia to the First Crusade in 1098. After his death, his principality fell apart and various other Armenians took control of fractions of it: Kogh Vasil controlled the area of Kaysun, Raban and Hromkla, Thoros controlled Edessa, Gabriel held Melitene and a certain Constantine the town of Gargar.

== See also ==
- Armenian Kingdom of Cilicia

== Bibliography ==
- Andrews, Tara L. (28 November 2016). Mattʿēos Uṙhayecʿi and His Chronicle History as Apocalypse in a Crossroads of Cultures. Brill. ISBN 9789004330351.
- Beihammer, Alexander Daniel (2017). Byzantium and the Emergence of Muslim Turkish Anatolia, ca. 1040-1130. Routledge. ISBN 978-1-138-22959-4.
- Dadoyan, Seta B. (2013). The Armenians in the Medieval Islamic World: Armenian Realpolitik in the Islamic World and Diverging Paradigms: Case of Cilicia Eleventh to Fourteenth Centuries. Transaction Publishers.
- Dostourian, A. (1993). Armenia and the Crusades, 10th to 12th Centuries. Chronicles of Matthew of Edessa. London.
- Finlay, George (1854). History of the Byzantine and Greek Empires from 1057 – 1453. Vol. 2. William Blackwood & Sons.
- Giorgi, Andrea U. De; Eger, A. Asa (2021). Antioch: A History. Routledge. ISBN 978-1-317-54041-0.
- Gravett, Christopher; Nicolle, David (2006). The Normans: Warrior Knights and their Castles. Oxford: Osprey Publishing.
- Peacock, Andrew Charles Spencer; De Nicola, Bruno (9 March 2016). Islam and Christianity in Medieval Anatolia. Taylor & Francis.
- Richards, Jean (2008). "The Eastern Churches". New Cambridge Medieval History Volume 4. Cambridge University Press.
- Yarnley, C. J. (1972). "Philaretos: Armenian Bandit or Byzantine General". Revue des Études Arméniennes. 9. Paris: 331–353.

Preceded by Vasak Pahlavouni	Doux of Antioch; 1078–1084	Seljuk conquest
