= Michael Bourtzes =

Byzantine general

- Born: ca. 930/35
- Died: after 996
- Allegiance: Byzantine Empire
- Rank: strategos, doux of Antioch
- Battles / wars: Siege of Antioch (968–969), Revolt of Bardas Skleros, Battle of the Orontes

Michael Bourtzes (Greek: Μιχαήλ Βούρτζης, Arabic: Miḥā’īl al-Burdjī; ca. 930/35 – after 996) was a leading Byzantine general of the latter 10th century. He became notable for his capture of Antioch from the Arabs in 969, but fell into disgrace by the Emperor Nikephoros II Phokas. Resentful at the slight, Bourtzes joined forces with the conspirators who assassinated Phokas a few weeks later. Bourtzes re-appears in a prominent role in the civil war between Emperor Basil II and the rebel Bardas Skleros, switching his allegiance from the emperor to the rebel and back again. Nevertheless, he was re-appointed as doux of Antioch by Basil II, a post he held until 995, when he was relieved because of his failures in the war against the Fatimids.

== Biography ==
=== Career under Nikephoros II and John Tzimiskes ===
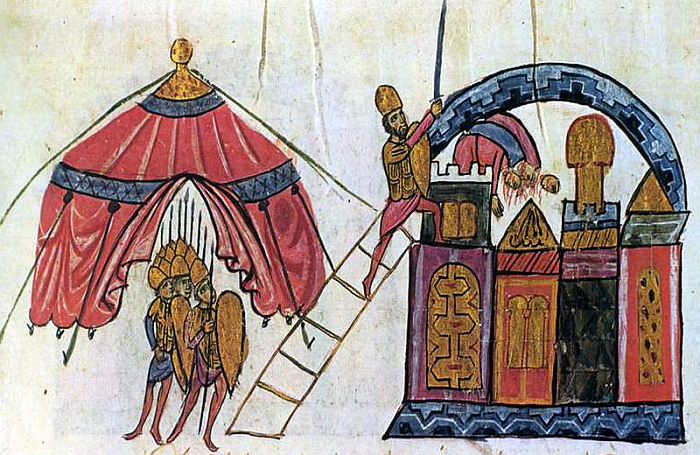
The capture of Antioch on 28 October 969 by the Byzantine forces under Bourtzes (shown stepping on the wall), from the chronicle of John Skylitzes.

Michael Bourtzes was the first prominent member of the Bourtzes family, originating in the upper Euphrates region, which went on to become one of the major clans of the Byzantine military aristocracy during the 11th century. The name has been proposed as deriving either from the Arabic burdj, "tower", or from the placename Bourtzo or Soterioupolis near Trebizond. Likewise the ethnic origin of the family is disputed among scholars: Vitalien Laurent and Jean-Claude Cheynet suggested an Arab origin, while Peter Charanis and Nicholas Adontz advocated an Armenian origin.

The date of Michael Bourtzes's birth is unknown, but must be placed sometime between 930 and 935. He is first mentioned in late 968, when he was appointed by Emperor Nikephoros II Phokas (reigned 963–969) as patrikios and strategos of the small theme of Mauron Oros ("Black Mountain"), on the southern outliers of the Amanus Mountains. With his base on the newly built fortress of Pagras, Bourtzes and his thousand men were tasked with controlling the northern approaches to the Arab-held city of Antioch. Acting against Nikephoros's orders not to assault the city in his absence, in the late autumn of 969, Bourtzes persuaded a traitor inside the city to surrender one of the wall's main towers, which he then promptly occupied on 28 October. He then defended this post against repeated attacks of the city's defenders for three days, until the reinforcements led by the stratopedarches Peter arrived and secured the city for the Byzantines. Despite his major role in this success, Bourtzes's reward was distinctly lacking: angry at him for disobeying his orders, or, according to another account, for laying fire and destroying much of the city, Emperor Nikephoros dismissed him from his post and appointed a kinsman of his, Eustathios Maleinos, as the first governor of Antioch.

Angered by this treatment, Bourtzes joined a conspiracy involving a number of other prominent generals who were discontent at Nikephoros, chief amongst them John Tzimiskes. On the night of 10/11 December 969, a group of these conspirators, including Tzimiskes and Bourtzes, managed to gain access to the imperial Boukoleon Palace by sea, and proceeded to murder the emperor and install Tzimiskes as his successor. Despite his prominent role in the assassination of Nikephoros II, the historical sources barely mention Bourtzes for the duration of Tzimiskes's reign (969–976). Only Yahya of Antioch records that in summer 971, with 12,000 men, he oversaw the repairs carried out to the walls of Antioch following an earthquake and executed one of the murderers of Patriarch Christopher, but it is not certain whether he had been placed in command there as governor. Rather, at the time of Tzimiskes's death in January 976, he is stated by John Skylitzes to have commanded the elite tagma of the Stratelatai in the army of Bardas Skleros.

=== Career under Basil II ===
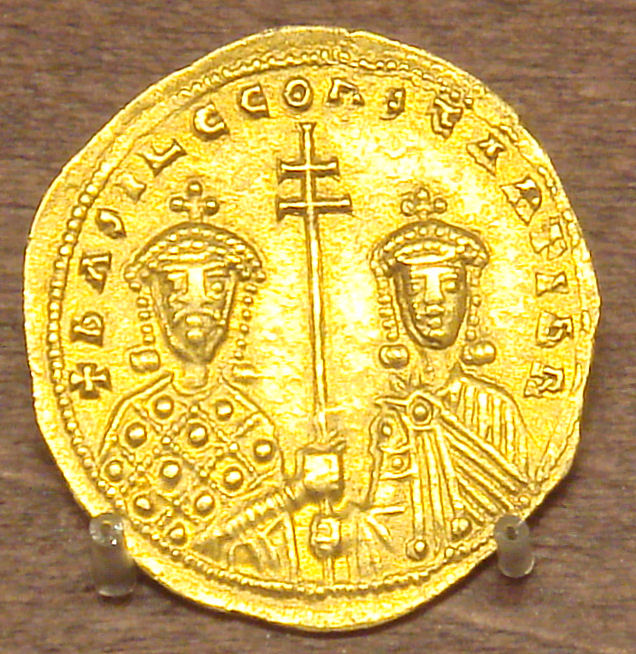
Emperor Basil II (r. 976–1025) with his younger brother and co-emperor, Constantine VIII.

At the point of Tzimiskes's death, imperial power reverted to the legitimate emperors, the young brothers Basil II (r. 976–1025) and Constantine VIII (co-emperor until 1025, sole emperor in 1025–28). In view of their youth and inexperience, however, government essentially continued to be exercised by the powerful parakoimomenos, Basil Lekapenos. Almost immediately, the parakoimomenos moved to forestall any moves by one of the powerful Anatolian magnates to seize the throne and reign as a supposed "guardian" of the two young emperors, like Phokas and Tzimiskes had done. A general reshuffle of the most important army posts in the East followed, interpreted by later historians like Skylitzes as a move to weaken the position of over-powerful strategoi. At this point, Bourtzes was appointed commander of the troops in northern Syria, with his seat at Antioch; indeed, he seems to have been the first to be titled doux of Antioch. According to Skylitzes, this move was designed by the parakoimomenos to wean him away from his close relationship with Skleros, who as one of the Empire's senior generals and de facto second-in-command under his relative Tzimiskes, was a prime candidate for usurping the throne. Almost immediately after his appointment, Bourtzes set out in a deep raid into Fatimid-controlled Syria, reaching Tripolis and returning with much booty.

In spring, however, Bardas Skleros, now appointed doux of Mesopotamia, rose in revolt and proclaimed himself emperor at his base in Melitene. Bourtzes was commanded by Constantinople to lead his force north, join the army of Eustathios Maleinos, now governor of Cilicia, and block the rebel from crossing the Antitaurus Mountains. Leaving his son in control of Antioch, Bourtzes complied and marched north. In the ensuing battle at the fortress of Lapara in the province of Lykandos (autumn 976), however, the combined loyalist force was routed, with Bourtzes being the first to retreat according to the chroniclers. As Skylitzes pointedly comments, Bourtzes' conduct during the battle was attributed either to cowardice or to malice; certainly soon after, he deserted the imperial camp and joined Skleros. According to the contemporary Yahya of Antioch, Bourtzes at first fled to a fortress in the Anatolic Theme, but was followed by Skleros and persuaded to come over to his side. Bourtzes's defection brought Skleros control of Antioch as well: Bourtzes commanded his son Constantine to join him, and the city was left in the hands of the Arab Kulayb, who was soon overthrown by another Arab, Ubaydallah, who also joined Skleros. In the summer of 977, Boutzes was deployed, along with Romanos Taronites, in command of Skleros's forces shadowing the operations of the imperial army advancing from Kotyaion to Ikonion. The presence of the tribute caravan from Aleppo entangled the two forces in an impromptu fight at Oxylithos, which ended in a bloody defeat for the rebels. After this, Bourtzes again switched sides and rejoined the imperial army, now led by Bardas Phokas.

Nothing is known of Bourtzes's career for the next twelve years. Uniquely amongst the military leaders who had revolted against him, Basil II continued to rely on Bourtzes and entrusted him again with the critical position of doux of Antioch in 989, in the aftermath of another rebellion, this time of Bardas Phokas. In November 989, Bourtzes took the city over from Leo Phokas, the son of Bardas, who himself had submitted to the emperor only months earlier. From this position, over the next few years Bourtzes led the defence of the imperial frontier in a renewed bout of fighting with the Fatimids, as the two empires disputed control over the Hamdanid emirate of Aleppo.

In 991 he provided military assistance to the Hamdanid emir of Aleppo, Sa'd al-Dawla, which enabled the latter to defeat the rebel Bakjur, who with Fatimid help tried to seize Aleppo. Early in the next year, a Fatimid army under Manjutakin advanced on Aleppo. Manjutakin sent a messenger to Bourtzes, claiming that his conflict was with Aleppo, and did not involve the Byzantines, but Bourtzes had the messenger arrested. After defeating the Hamdanids in battle near Apamea, Manjutakin laid siege to Aleppo for 33 days, after which he left part of his forces behind and led the rest to confront Bourtzes, who was marching to the city's aid. At the ensuing battle at Siderophygon (Arabic Jisr al-Hadith) Bourtzes and his men were defeated. Manjutakin followed up his success by capturing the fortress of Imm, commanded by Bourtzes' nephew, and taking him and 300 troops prisoner, before embarking on a plundering raid through Byzantine territory as far as Germanikeia (Ar. Mar'ash). The Fatimid general returned to Aleppo, but was unable to take it and withdrew later in the year. At about the same time, the Muslim population of Laodicea, Antioch's seaport, rose in revolt, but Bourtzes was able to put it down and deported the populace to the interior of Byzantine territory in Asia Minor.

In the late summer of 993, Manjutakin launched yet another expedition, capturing Apamea and Larissa (Ar. Shayzar) and continuing his raids in the Byzantine province around Antioch, before returning safely to Damascus. In spring 994, Manjutakin once more moved against Aleppo. Responding to the calls for aid by the Hamdanids, Basil II ordered Bourtzes to come to their aid, and sent the magistors Leo Melissenos with reinforcements to Syria. The Byzantine army however was surprised and heavily defeated when attacked on two flanks by Manjutakin in a battle at the banks of the Orontes, on 15 September 994. Manjutakin went on to capture Azaz and continued his siege of Aleppo until the personal intervention of Basil II in a lightning campaign the next year. These failures, as well as accusations that he had exacerbated the conflict by imprisoning the Fatimid ambassador in 992, brought Basil's displeasure upon Bourtzes, who was replaced with Damian Dalassenos.

Nothing more is known of Michael Bourtzes after that, and it may be that he died sometime around the autumn of 995. He did, however, have at least three sons, Michael, Theognostos, and Samuel, known because they conspired against Constantine VIII after he blinded Michael's son, named Constantine, in 1025/26.

== Sources ==
- Cheynet, Jean-Claude; Vannier, Jean-François (1986). Études Prosopographiques. Paris: Publications de la Sorbonne. ISBN 978-2-85944-110-4.
- Holmes, Catherine (2005). Basil II and the Governance of Empire (976–1025). Oxford: Oxford University Press. ISBN 978-0-19-927968-5.
- Kazhdan, Alexander, ed. (1991). The Oxford Dictionary of Byzantium. Oxford and New York: Oxford University Press. ISBN 0-19-504652-8.
- Lilie, Ralph-Johannes; Ludwig, Claudia; Pratsch, Thomas; Zielke, Beate (2013). Prosopographie der mittelbyzantinischen Zeit Online. Berlin-Brandenburgische Akademie der Wissenschaften. Nach Vorarbeiten F. Winkelmanns erstellt (in German). Berlin and Boston: De Gruyter.
- Magdalino, Paul, ed. (2003). Byzantium in the Year 1000. Leiden: Brill. ISBN 90-04-12097-1.
- Stouraitis, Ioannis (2003). "Michael Bourtzes". Encyclopedia of the Hellenic World, Asia Minor. Foundation of the Hellenic World.
- Trombley, Frank (1997). "The Taktika of Nikephoros Ouranos and Military Encyclopaedism". In Binkley, Peter (ed.). Pre-Modern Encyclopaedic Texts: Proceedings of the Second COMERS Congress, Groningen, 1–4 July 1996. Leiden: Brill. pp. 261–274. ISBN 978-90-04-10830-1.
- Whittow, Mark (1996). The Making of Byzantium, 600–1025. Berkeley and Los Angeles, California: University of California Press. ISBN 978-0-520-20496-6.

Preceded by Leo Phokas the Younger	Doux of Antioch; 989–995/6	Succeeded by Damian Dalassenos
