= Nikephoritzes =

11th-century Byzantine official

Nikephoritzes (Greek: Νικηφορίτζης) was an influential Byzantine eunuch official, who served as chief minister and virtual ruler of the Byzantine Empire during the reign of Emperor Michael VII Doukas (r. 1071–1078). His actual name was Nikephoros; he received the nickname "Nikephoritzes" ("little Nikephoros") as a result of his relative youth when he first entered service in the court. He became widely unpopular due to his harsh taxation and meddling with Constantinople's grain supply, as well as for his neglect of Asia Minor in the face of Turkish encroachment. This resentment led to the outbreak of two major rebellions in 1077, and the eventual abdication of Michael VII. Nikephoritzes himself was captured and tortured to death.

== Biography ==
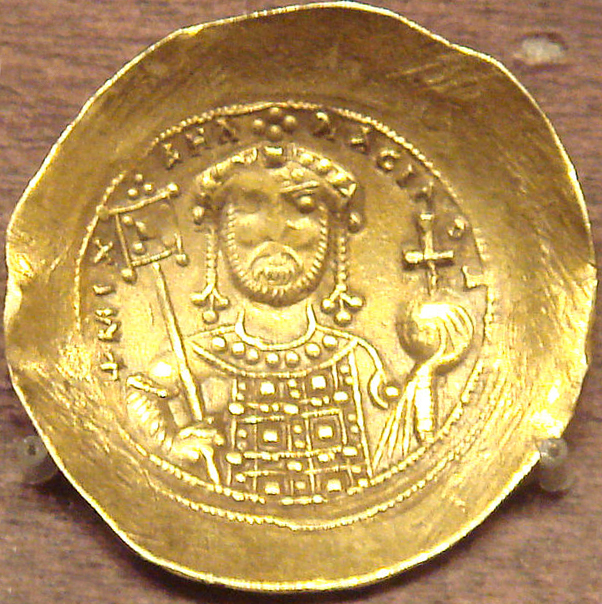
Gold histamenon of Emperor Michael VII Doukas (r. 1071–1078).

Nikephoritzes was born in the Bucellarian Theme and entered service in the imperial secretariat under Emperor Constantine IX Monomachos (r. 1042–1055). Under Constantine X Doukas (r. 1059–1067), he was sent away from the court to assume the governorship of Antioch, because he allegedly slandered the Empress Eudokia Makrembolitissa, accusing her of adultery. Following the emperor's death and her assumption of the regency, he was imprisoned. He was released by the new emperor, Romanos IV Diogenes (r. 1068–1071), and appointed as praetor (civil governor) of the combined themes of Hellas (Central Greece) and the Peloponnese. On the assumption of power by Michael VII in 1071, Nikephoritzes was recalled to serve in the imperial government by the new emperor's uncle, the Caesar John Doukas, who valued his administrative skills. Back in Constantinople, Nikephoritzes was appointed logothetes tou dromou, and his power grew rapidly. Not only did he soon sideline the other ministers, including the hereto powerful Michael Psellos, but in autumn 1073, Nikephoritzes forced the Caesar himself to withdraw from active participation in the governance of the Byzantine Empire and retire to his estates.

As the de facto ruler of the Byzantine Empire, Nikephoritzes set about reorganizing the state, trying to restore its strength and re-establish central control. His first priority was to replenish the treasury. For this he resorted to brutal taxation, which caused major hardship both in the provinces and in Constantinople. He also established a central warehouse (phoundax) at Rhaidestos in an effort to centralize, regulate, and better tax the corn supply of Constantinople, forming a state monopoly. According to Michael Attaleiates, admittedly a hostile source, his policies resulted in shortages in grain and inflation of its price. By the winter of 1076/1077, Constantinople was experiencing famine. At the same time, a rebellion broke out in the Danubian province of Paristrion, because Nikephoritzes stopped payment of the annual subsidies to the local mixobarbaroi and the Pechenegs. The vestarches Nestor, who was sent to settle things, joined the rebellion. Notably, the rebels demanded only one thing, the dismissal of Nikephoritzes, and when they took Rhaidestos, they burned down the corn warehouse. Michael VII prevaricated in his reply, whereupon Nestor with his Pecheneg allies withdrew north into the Paristrion, which hence and for the next two decades effectively passed out of imperial control.

Nikephoritzes also tried to reform the army, and revived the regiment of the Immortals. The military situation during his administration was particularly grave, with Serb attacks and the Bulgarian uprising of Constantine Bodin, while in Asia Minor the imperial government had to face the rebellion of Roussel de Bailleul, as well as the ever-increasing Turkish infiltration of Asia Minor in the aftermath of the Battle of Manzikert, to which it failed to respond adequately. Although undeniably a capable administrator, his financial measures and centralizing tendencies were generally resented. With the exception of Kekaumenos, who praises him as "an excellent man in everything, most reasonable, experienced in both military and administrative matters although a eunuch, generous, very clever, and capable of understanding and speaking properly", the other sources all relate stories of his greed and corruption. In this, they focus especially on the monastery at Hebdomon, which he administrated, and where he gathered his personal fortune.

Opposition coalesced around the Patriarch of Antioch Aemilian, an old enemy of Nikephoritzes from his time in Antioch, with support from several bishops and the capital's guilds. In addition, in the summer of 1077, Nikephoros Bryennios in the Balkans and Nikephoros Botaneiates in Asia Minor rebelled against Michael VII. Bryennios marched against Constantinople, hoping it would surrender, but the pillaging of its suburbs by his troops deterred the capital's inhabitants, and he had to retreat. In turn, a group of bishops opposing Nikephoritzes gathered in Hagia Sophia on January 7, 1078, and proclaimed Botaneiates emperor. Nikephoritzes responded by forcibly removing them from the cathedral, for which he was excommunicated by the Patriarch of Constantinople. Alexios Komnenos, who had risen to high command under Nikephoritzes, suggested the forcible suppression of the opposition, but Michael VII eventually decided to abdicate in favour of Botaneiates, on March 31, 1078.

Nikephoritzes fled the capital and sought refuge in Heraclea Pontica, where Roussel de Bailleul was encamped. Roussel, however, had him arrested and delivered to the new emperor. Nikephoritzes was then exiled to the island of Prote and then Oxeia, where he was brutally tortured by the megas hetaireiarches Romanos Straboromanos and died as a result.

== Sources ==
- Angold, Michael (1997). The Byzantine Empire, 1025–1204: A Political History (Second ed.). London and New York: Longman. ISBN 0-582-29468-1.
- Kazhdan, Alexander, ed. (1991). The Oxford Dictionary of Byzantium. Oxford and New York: Oxford University Press. ISBN 0-19-504652-8.
- Prosopography of the Byzantine World (2011). "Nikephoros 63".
- Stephenson, Paul (2000). Byzantium's Balkan Frontier: A Political Study of the Northern Balkans, 900–1204. Cambridge: Cambridge University Press. ISBN 0-521-77017-3.

Unknown Last known title holder: Bekhd (1065)	Doux of Antioch; 1067	Succeeded by Nikephoros Botaneiates
Unknown Last known title holder: Nikephoros Botaneiates (uncertain) or Adrian Dalassenos (1059)	Doux of Antioch; 1062–1063	Unknown Next known title holder: Bekhd (1065)
