= Peter (stratopedarches) =

Byzantine eunuch general (died 977)

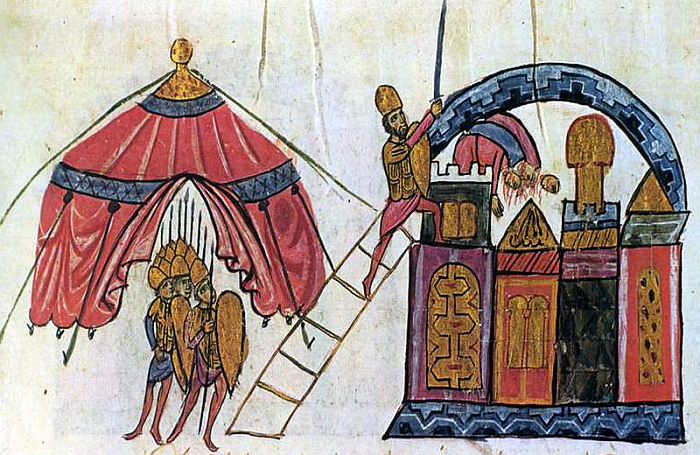
Fall of Antioch in 969.png

Peter (Greek: Πέτρος; died 977) was a Byzantine eunuch general. Originally a servant of the powerful Cappadocian Phokas family, he was raised to high military office (stratopedarches of the East) under Emperor Nikephoros II Phokas, leading the capture of Antioch and the subjugation of Aleppo in 969. Under John I Tzimiskes, he fought as a senior commander against the Rus' in 970–971, while after Tzimiskes' death he led the loyalist forces against the revolt of the general Bardas Skleros in Asia Minor, falling in battle in autumn 977.

== Biography ==
According to several Byzantine sources, Peter was originally a servant or member of the personal retinue of Nikephoros II Phokas. The exact relationship is unclear; although he is termed a slave, it is more likely that he was simply a manservant. Due to a mistranslation of a passage by Zonaras, he has been sometimes erroneously identified as a member of the Phokas clan and is known in some modern works as "Peter Phokas". Although a eunuch, Peter proved himself a strong warrior, and his abilities as a general are uniformly praised in contemporary accounts. The historian Leo the Deacon writes that he "abounded in bodily strength" and records that he once defeated in single combat the leader of a "Scythian" (Rus' or Magyar) warband in Thrace. Nothing is known of his early life and career, but he may have held the post of epi tes trapezes (master of the table) as Arab sources call him al-Aṭrābāzī and aṭ-Ṭrabāzī.

In spring 967, following the dismissal of John Tzimiskes from the high command of the Byzantine Empire's eastern forces, Nikephoros appointed Peter to the new post of stratopedarches, and gave him overall command of the eastern army. This new post is most likely explained by the fact that, being a eunuch, Peter could not occupy the office of Domestic of the Schools, which traditionally designated the Byzantine commanders-in-chief. His first task was to counter an expedition by Khurasani troops under Muhammad ibn Isa, who had arrived at Antioch. Peter defeated them near Alexandretta and took Muhammad captive, until the Antiochenes ransomed him.

In 968 Nikephoros II himself came east to take up the reins of his army. Peter participated in the emperor's invasion of Hamdanid-ruled northern Syria and the subsequent prolonged siege of Antioch, which culminated in the fall of the city. In this operation, the strategos Michael Bourtzes had the initiative, seizing one of the city's main towers in a coup de main. At this time, Peter was marching with his forces towards Aleppo on the request of Qarghuyah, who had usurped power there, to relieve its siege by loyalist Hamdanid troops under Sa'd al-Dawla. Learning of Bourtzes' feat, Peter turned back and reached Antioch three days later. After the capture of Antioch, which took place on October 28, the two Byzantine generals resumed their advance on Aleppo, forcing Sa'd al-Dawla to flee. The Byzantines proceeded to attack Aleppo themselves, with the populace withdrawing to the citadel and abandoning the lower city to the imperial troops. After a siege of 27 days, Qarghuyah and his lieutenant Bakjur capitulated. In the Treaty of Safar, Aleppo and the former Hamdanid domains of northern Syria became an imperial vassal, hostages were given, an annual tribute was to be paid to the emperor, and a Byzantine tax official was to be established in the city. The Byzantines on the other hand recognized Qarguyah as the ruler of Aleppo, and Bakjur as his successor.

After Nikephoros's assassination by John Tzimiskes in December 969, Peter, despite his close association with the murdered emperor, continued in active service during Tzimiskes's reign (r. 969–976), when he participated in the war against the Rus' in Bulgaria as leader of the tagmata of Macedonia and Thrace. He is mentioned as guarding the western wall of Dorostolon during its siege by the Byzantines, while Bardas Skleros guarded the eastern one. It is possibly during this campaign that Leo the Deacon's incident with his single combat against the "Scythian" leader took place.

In 976, Tzimiskes died, and the throne reverted to the legitimate emperors of the Macedonian dynasty, the young brothers Basil II and Constantine VIII, under the tutelage of the parakoimomenos Basil Lekapenos. The throne was coveted, however, by Bardas Skleros, who as commander-in-chief of the eastern armies and a relative of Tzimiskes had been his effective second in command. In a move designed to lessen Skleros' power, Lekapenos replaced him with Peter and sent him to the post of doux of Antioch instead. It is at this point that Peter probably received the rank of patrikios; he is mentioned by Leo the Deacon and Arab sources as a patrikios already in 969, but this is more likely a generic use in the sense of "commander". Undeterred, Skleros shortly after rose in revolt, being proclaimed emperor by his supporters. Peter was sent out, together with the patrikios Eustathios Maleinos, against the rebel's stronghold, the region around Melitene. During the siege of the rebel fortress of Lapara, however, sometime in the summer of 976, Skleros's army attacked unexpectedly, routing the loyalist army. Withdrawing to Kotyaion in western Anatolia, the remains of this army were joined by new forces. Under the command of the eunuch Leo, the loyalist army marched east again in autumn 977. The imperial army managed to score a success against Skleros' subordinates, Michael Bourtzes and Romanos Taronites, but in a pitched battle at Rhageai near Iconium, they were decisively defeated by Skleros himself. Among many other loyalist commanders, Peter too fell on the battlefield.

== Sources ==
- Bréhier, Louis (1946). Le monde byzantin: Vie et mort de Byzance (PDF) (in French). Paris: Éditions Albin Michel. Archived from the original (PDF) on 2011-06-16.
- Holmes, Catherine (2005). Basil II and the Governance of Empire (976–1025). Oxford: Oxford University Press. ISBN 978-0-19-927968-5.
- Kazhdan, Alexander Petrovich, ed. (1991). The Oxford Dictionary of Byzantium. New York and Oxford: Oxford University Press. ISBN 978-0-19-504652-6.
- Lilie, Ralph-Johannes; Ludwig, Claudia; Zielke, Beate; Pratsch, Thomas, eds. (2013). "Prosopographie der mittelbyzantinischen Zeit Online". Prosopographie der mittelbyzantinischen Zeit Online. Berlin-Brandenburgische Akademie der Wissenschaften. Nach Vorarbeiten F. Winkelmanns erstellt (in German). De Gruyter.
- Ringrose, Kathryn M. (2003). The Perfect Servant: Eunuchs and the Social Construction of Gender in Byzantium. Chicago, Illinois: The University of Chicago Press. ISBN 978-0-226-72015-9.
- Whittow, Mark (1996). The Making of Byzantium, 600–1025. Berkeley and Los Angeles, California: University of California Press. ISBN 0-520-20496-4.
