= Battle of the Orontes =

994 battle of the Arab-Byzantine Wars

Coordinates: 35°15′N 36°35′E

- Part of the Arab–Byzantine wars
- Map of the Arab–Byzantine frontier zone
Date	15 September 994
Location	Orontes River (Syria)
Result	Fatimid victory

Belligerents
Byzantine Empire; Hamdanids	Fatimid Caliphate

Commanders and leaders
Michael Bourtzes	Manjutakin

Casualties and losses
5,000 killed	Unknown

The Battle of the Orontes was fought on 15 September 994 between the Byzantines and their Hamdanid allies under Michael Bourtzes against the forces of the Fatimid vizier of Damascus, the Turkish general Manjutakin. The battle was a Fatimid victory.

== Background ==
In the 990s, the Byzantine Empire and the Fatimids were involved in a war in Syria, which also involved the Byzantine vassal state of Aleppo, controlled by the Hamdanid dynasty. In 993/994, the Fatimid governor of Damascus, the Turkish general Manjutakin, besieged Apamea, and Bourtzes, the Byzantine doux of Antioch, came forth to relieve the city.

== Battle ==
The two armies met across two fords on the Orontes River near Apamea on 15 September 994. Manjutakin sent his forces to attack the Byzantines' Hamdanid allies across one ford while pinning the main Byzantine force down on the other with his Turks and mercenary units. His men succeeded in breaking through the Hamdanids, turned round and attacked the Byzantine force in the rear. The Byzantine army panicked and fled, losing some 5,000 men in the process.

== Aftermath ==
Shortly after the battle, the Fatimid caliphate took control of Syria, removing the Hamdanids from power they had held since 890. Manjutakin went on to capture Azaz and continued his siege of Aleppo.

This defeat led to the direct intervention of Byzantine emperor Basil II in a lightning campaign the next year, and Bourtzes' dismissal from his post and his replacement by Damian Dalassenos. Basil's sudden arrival and the exaggeration of his army's strength circulating in the Fatimid camp caused panic in the Fatimid army, especially because Manjutakin, expecting no threat, had ordered his cavalry horses to be dispersed around the city for pasture. Despite having a considerably larger and well-rested army, Manjutakin was at a disadvantage. He burned his camp and retreated to Damascus without battle. The Byzantines besieged Tripoli unsuccessfully and occupied Tartus, which they refortified and garrisoned with Armenian troops.

== Sources ==
- Trombley, Frank (1997), "The Taktika of Nikephoros Ouranos and Military Encyclopaedism", in Binkley, Peter (ed.), Pre-modern encyclopaedic texts: proceedings of the second COMERS Congress, Groningen, 1–4 July 1996, Brill, pp. 269–270, ISBN 978-90-04-10830-1.
- Melton, J. Gordon (2014). Faiths across time : 5,000 years of religious history. Santa Barbara, California. ISBN 978-1-61069-025-6. OCLC 869548511.
- Holmes, Catherine (2005). Basil II and the governance of Empire (976–1025). Oxford: Oxford University Press. ISBN 978-0-19-153550-5. OCLC 77175413.
- Scylitzes, John (2010). A synopsis of Byzantine history, 811–1057. John Wortley. Cambridge: Cambridge University Press. ISBN 978-0-511-85853-6. OCLC 694342139.
