= Treaty of Safar =

969/970 treaty between the Byzantine Empire and Qarquya

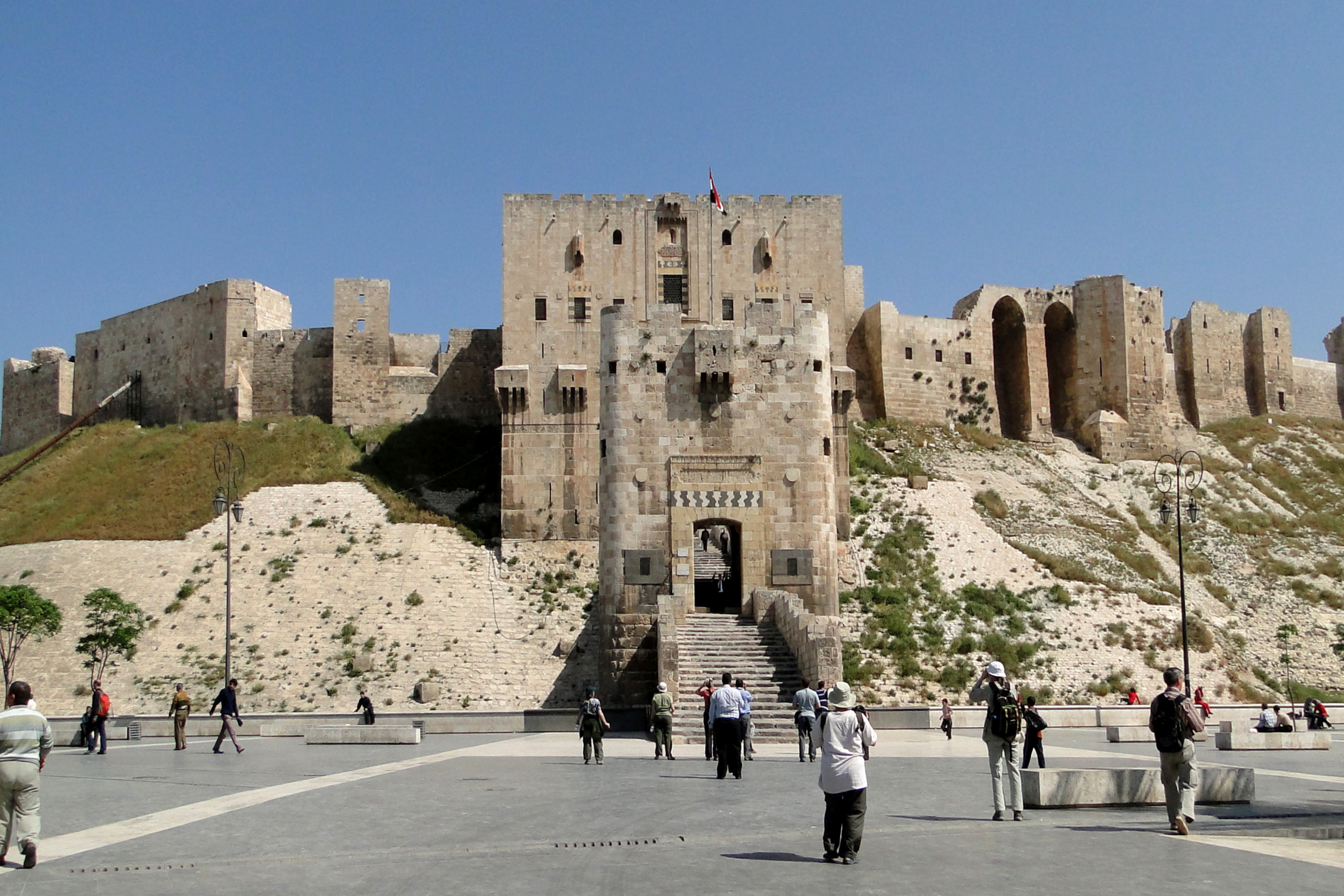
Citadel of Aleppo, Syria

The Treaty of Safar put a formal end to the extended collapse of the Hamdanid Dynasty. It was signed in December 969/January 970 between the Byzantine stratopedarches Petros and the former minister of the Hamdanids and rebel, Qarquya. Following the death of the Hamdanid emir Sayf al-Dawla in 967, rebellion quickly enveloped the Hamdanids and the dynasty disintegrated into chaos and disorder. The Byzantines saw this as an opportunity to finally take control of Aleppo. Petros soon approached Aleppo, probably without orders from Constantinople, and took the city in January 970.

== Terms ==
The treaty was signed sometime in the month of Safar 359 AH according to the Islamic calendar (corresponding to 14 December 969–11 January 970 CE) between Petros and Qarquya. It established the emirate of Aleppo as a Byzantine tributary state. As part of the terms of the treaty, a defensive alliance was established between Byzantium and Aleppo; religious converts would not be persecuted on either side; armies from other Muslim states would not be allowed to pass through Aleppo; taxes would be sent to Constantinople; and the emperor would nominate future emirs. The treaty proved to have a lasting influence for a relatively long period of time. The text is preserved in the historical writing of Ibn al-Adim on Aleppo and has been translated into English by Wesam Farag.

According to its terms, much of northern Syria came under Byzantine rule. The new border began north of Tripoli and Arqa (in modern Lebanon), then moved east up to the Orontes River. From there it followed its course north, but apparently somewhat to the west of the actual river, as towns like Shayzar and Rafaniya were apparently not under Byzantine control. Along the border, the Arabs retained control of Hama, Jusiyah, Salamiyah, Afamiya and Kafartab. Then it passed to the highlands east of the Afrin River, leaving its fertile valley to the Byzantines; the Arabs retained control of the Jabal al-Sumaq massif with the towns of Ma'arrat al-Nu'man and Ma'arrat Misrin, Qinnasrin, the eastern part of Jabal Halaqa and the bulk of Jabal Sim'an with al-Atharib and al-Balat, Arhab, Basufan, and Kimar. The Jabal al-A'la, Jabal Barisha, the western part of Jabal Halaqa, and the Qal'at Sim'an fortress-monastery, formed the Byzantine side of the border. The border then followed the edge of the plain, west of Jabal Barsaya, Wadi Abi Sulayman, Azaz, and Killiz, up to the Pass of Sunyab, located by Ernst Honigmann at the sources of the Quwayq River. From there the border turned east, passing north of Nafuda, Awana, and Tall Khalid to the Sajur River, which it then followed until its junction with the Euphrates.

The Byzantine emperor would recognize Qarquya as the rightful emir, and his lieutenant Bakjur as his heir. Subsequently, however, the emperor would name both the emir and the qadi from the city's inhabitants. In return, however, Aleppo and its territory became tributary to Byzantium to the order of 700,000 silver dirhams annually, or a head tax of one gold dinar (equivalent to 16 dirham). Furthermore, an imperial official was installed in the city to collect a 10% tax on all goods imported from Byzantine territory, and the emirs of Aleppo were forced to prohibit armies from other Muslim states to pass through their territory, provide intelligence on any such armies moving against Byzantium, and render military assistance to any Byzantine army operating in Syria. The legal standing of Christians in Aleppine territory was guaranteed, and any slave or robber who fled from Byzantine territory had to be returned, along with any Muslim spy who came to gather intelligence on the Byzantines.

== Aftermath ==
With the indirect control of Aleppo now secured, the Byzantines also directly benefited from a new influx of trade in the region. The defense of Antioch was also now greatly enforced. The treaty was generally respected by the Hamdanids and the Byzantines for the next fifty years, despite the attempts of the Fatimid Caliphate to occupy Aleppo.

== Sources ==
- Vasiliev, Alexander A.; Grégoire, Henri; Canard, Marius; Honigmann, Ernst [in German] (1935–1968). Byzance et les Arabes. Corpus Bruxellense Historiae Byzantinae (in French). Vol. 1–3 (in 4 volumes). Brussels: Institut de philologie et d'histoire orientales et slaves & Fondation Byzantine.
- Todt, Klaus-Peter; Vest, Bernd Andreas (2014). Tabula Imperii Byzantini, Band 15: Syria (Syria Prōtē, Syria Deutera, Syria Euphratēsia) (in German). Vienna: Verlag der Österreichischen Akademie der Wissenschaften. ISBN 978-3-7001-7090-7.
